

524001–524100 

|-bgcolor=#d6d6d6
| 524001 ||  || — || October 3, 1999 || Kitt Peak || Spacewatch ||  || align=right | 3.0 km || 
|-id=002 bgcolor=#fefefe
| 524002 ||  || — || October 9, 1999 || Socorro || LINEAR ||  || align=right data-sort-value="0.73" | 730 m || 
|-id=003 bgcolor=#E9E9E9
| 524003 ||  || — || October 12, 1999 || Kitt Peak || Spacewatch ||  || align=right | 1.2 km || 
|-id=004 bgcolor=#E9E9E9
| 524004 ||  || — || October 13, 1999 || Kitt Peak || Spacewatch ||  || align=right | 1.7 km || 
|-id=005 bgcolor=#E9E9E9
| 524005 ||  || — || October 11, 1999 || Kitt Peak || Spacewatch ||  || align=right | 1.9 km || 
|-id=006 bgcolor=#E9E9E9
| 524006 ||  || — || October 31, 1999 || Kitt Peak || Spacewatch ||  || align=right | 1.6 km || 
|-id=007 bgcolor=#fefefe
| 524007 ||  || — || October 30, 1999 || Catalina || CSS || H || align=right data-sort-value="0.68" | 680 m || 
|-id=008 bgcolor=#fefefe
| 524008 ||  || — || October 3, 1999 || Socorro || LINEAR ||  || align=right | 1.0 km || 
|-id=009 bgcolor=#fefefe
| 524009 ||  || — || October 19, 1999 || Kitt Peak || Spacewatch ||  || align=right data-sort-value="0.86" | 860 m || 
|-id=010 bgcolor=#fefefe
| 524010 ||  || — || October 31, 1999 || Kitt Peak || Spacewatch ||  || align=right data-sort-value="0.64" | 640 m || 
|-id=011 bgcolor=#E9E9E9
| 524011 ||  || — || November 1, 1999 || Kitt Peak || Spacewatch ||  || align=right | 1.4 km || 
|-id=012 bgcolor=#d6d6d6
| 524012 ||  || — || November 6, 1999 || Kitt Peak || Spacewatch ||  || align=right | 2.7 km || 
|-id=013 bgcolor=#fefefe
| 524013 ||  || — || November 3, 1999 || Kitt Peak || Spacewatch ||  || align=right | 1.0 km || 
|-id=014 bgcolor=#d6d6d6
| 524014 ||  || — || November 3, 1999 || Kitt Peak || Spacewatch ||  || align=right | 2.3 km || 
|-id=015 bgcolor=#fefefe
| 524015 ||  || — || November 9, 1999 || Kitt Peak || Spacewatch ||  || align=right data-sort-value="0.81" | 810 m || 
|-id=016 bgcolor=#E9E9E9
| 524016 ||  || — || October 29, 1999 || Kitt Peak || Spacewatch ||  || align=right | 1.8 km || 
|-id=017 bgcolor=#E9E9E9
| 524017 ||  || — || November 14, 1999 || Socorro || LINEAR ||  || align=right | 1.4 km || 
|-id=018 bgcolor=#fefefe
| 524018 ||  || — || November 9, 1999 || Socorro || LINEAR ||  || align=right data-sort-value="0.66" | 660 m || 
|-id=019 bgcolor=#d6d6d6
| 524019 ||  || — || November 1, 1999 || Kitt Peak || Spacewatch ||  || align=right | 2.4 km || 
|-id=020 bgcolor=#E9E9E9
| 524020 ||  || — || November 1, 1999 || Kitt Peak || Spacewatch ||  || align=right | 1.1 km || 
|-id=021 bgcolor=#E9E9E9
| 524021 ||  || — || November 29, 1999 || Kitt Peak || Spacewatch ||  || align=right | 1.8 km || 
|-id=022 bgcolor=#E9E9E9
| 524022 ||  || — || November 16, 1999 || Kitt Peak || Spacewatch ||  || align=right | 1.8 km || 
|-id=023 bgcolor=#fefefe
| 524023 ||  || — || November 17, 1999 || Kitt Peak || Spacewatch ||  || align=right data-sort-value="0.65" | 650 m || 
|-id=024 bgcolor=#fefefe
| 524024 ||  || — || November 28, 1999 || Kitt Peak || Spacewatch ||  || align=right data-sort-value="0.72" | 720 m || 
|-id=025 bgcolor=#fefefe
| 524025 ||  || — || December 7, 1999 || Socorro || LINEAR ||  || align=right data-sort-value="0.94" | 940 m || 
|-id=026 bgcolor=#E9E9E9
| 524026 ||  || — || December 2, 1999 || Kitt Peak || Spacewatch ||  || align=right | 2.1 km || 
|-id=027 bgcolor=#fefefe
| 524027 ||  || — || December 13, 1999 || Kitt Peak || Spacewatch ||  || align=right data-sort-value="0.65" | 650 m || 
|-id=028 bgcolor=#E9E9E9
| 524028 ||  || — || December 7, 1999 || Kitt Peak || Spacewatch ||  || align=right | 1.6 km || 
|-id=029 bgcolor=#fefefe
| 524029 ||  || — || December 12, 1999 || Kitt Peak || Spacewatch ||  || align=right data-sort-value="0.62" | 620 m || 
|-id=030 bgcolor=#fefefe
| 524030 ||  || — || December 12, 1999 || Kitt Peak || Spacewatch ||  || align=right data-sort-value="0.81" | 810 m || 
|-id=031 bgcolor=#d6d6d6
| 524031 ||  || — || December 4, 1999 || Kitt Peak || Spacewatch ||  || align=right | 3.2 km || 
|-id=032 bgcolor=#E9E9E9
| 524032 ||  || — || December 27, 1999 || Kitt Peak || Spacewatch ||  || align=right | 2.5 km || 
|-id=033 bgcolor=#fefefe
| 524033 ||  || — || January 6, 2000 || Socorro || LINEAR ||  || align=right data-sort-value="0.97" | 970 m || 
|-id=034 bgcolor=#E9E9E9
| 524034 ||  || — || May 22, 2006 || Kitt Peak || Spacewatch ||  || align=right | 2.0 km || 
|-id=035 bgcolor=#fefefe
| 524035 ||  || — || January 5, 2000 || Kitt Peak || Spacewatch ||  || align=right data-sort-value="0.79" | 790 m || 
|-id=036 bgcolor=#E9E9E9
| 524036 ||  || — || January 12, 2000 || Kitt Peak || Spacewatch ||  || align=right | 2.7 km || 
|-id=037 bgcolor=#E9E9E9
| 524037 ||  || — || December 27, 1999 || Kitt Peak || Spacewatch ||  || align=right | 2.7 km || 
|-id=038 bgcolor=#E9E9E9
| 524038 ||  || — || December 27, 1999 || Kitt Peak || Spacewatch ||  || align=right | 2.2 km || 
|-id=039 bgcolor=#E9E9E9
| 524039 ||  || — || January 12, 2000 || Kitt Peak || Spacewatch ||  || align=right | 1.9 km || 
|-id=040 bgcolor=#fefefe
| 524040 ||  || — || January 26, 2000 || Kitt Peak || Spacewatch ||  || align=right data-sort-value="0.46" | 460 m || 
|-id=041 bgcolor=#fefefe
| 524041 ||  || — || January 28, 2000 || Kitt Peak || Spacewatch ||  || align=right data-sort-value="0.67" | 670 m || 
|-id=042 bgcolor=#E9E9E9
| 524042 ||  || — || January 28, 2000 || Kitt Peak || Spacewatch ||  || align=right | 2.5 km || 
|-id=043 bgcolor=#fefefe
| 524043 ||  || — || January 30, 2000 || Kitt Peak || Spacewatch ||  || align=right data-sort-value="0.66" | 660 m || 
|-id=044 bgcolor=#d6d6d6
| 524044 ||  || — || February 1, 2000 || Kitt Peak || Spacewatch ||  || align=right | 2.0 km || 
|-id=045 bgcolor=#E9E9E9
| 524045 ||  || — || February 7, 2000 || Kitt Peak || Spacewatch ||  || align=right | 1.5 km || 
|-id=046 bgcolor=#E9E9E9
| 524046 ||  || — || February 8, 2000 || Kitt Peak || Spacewatch ||  || align=right | 2.0 km || 
|-id=047 bgcolor=#fefefe
| 524047 ||  || — || February 11, 2000 || Kitt Peak || Spacewatch ||  || align=right | 1.2 km || 
|-id=048 bgcolor=#d6d6d6
| 524048 ||  || — || February 7, 2000 || Kitt Peak || Spacewatch ||  || align=right | 2.8 km || 
|-id=049 bgcolor=#C2E0FF
| 524049 ||  || — || February 5, 2000 || Kitt Peak || M. W. Buie || SDO || align=right | 243 km || 
|-id=050 bgcolor=#E9E9E9
| 524050 ||  || — || April 11, 1996 || Kitt Peak || Spacewatch ||  || align=right | 1.9 km || 
|-id=051 bgcolor=#fefefe
| 524051 ||  || — || February 1, 2000 || Kitt Peak || Spacewatch ||  || align=right data-sort-value="0.54" | 540 m || 
|-id=052 bgcolor=#fefefe
| 524052 ||  || — || February 2, 2000 || Kitt Peak || Spacewatch ||  || align=right data-sort-value="0.70" | 700 m || 
|-id=053 bgcolor=#d6d6d6
| 524053 ||  || — || February 4, 2000 || Kitt Peak || Spacewatch || Tj (2.96) || align=right | 3.6 km || 
|-id=054 bgcolor=#fefefe
| 524054 ||  || — || February 29, 2000 || Socorro || LINEAR || H || align=right data-sort-value="0.74" | 740 m || 
|-id=055 bgcolor=#d6d6d6
| 524055 ||  || — || February 29, 2000 || Socorro || LINEAR ||  || align=right | 3.5 km || 
|-id=056 bgcolor=#E9E9E9
| 524056 ||  || — || February 26, 2000 || Kitt Peak || Spacewatch ||  || align=right | 2.2 km || 
|-id=057 bgcolor=#E9E9E9
| 524057 ||  || — || March 2, 2000 || Kitt Peak || Spacewatch ||  || align=right | 2.1 km || 
|-id=058 bgcolor=#fefefe
| 524058 ||  || — || March 3, 2000 || Kitt Peak || Spacewatch ||  || align=right data-sort-value="0.62" | 620 m || 
|-id=059 bgcolor=#fefefe
| 524059 ||  || — || March 11, 2000 || Prescott || P. G. Comba ||  || align=right data-sort-value="0.81" | 810 m || 
|-id=060 bgcolor=#fefefe
| 524060 ||  || — || March 10, 2000 || Socorro || LINEAR ||  || align=right data-sort-value="0.75" | 750 m || 
|-id=061 bgcolor=#d6d6d6
| 524061 ||  || — || March 10, 2000 || Kitt Peak || Spacewatch ||  || align=right | 2.1 km || 
|-id=062 bgcolor=#d6d6d6
| 524062 ||  || — || March 14, 2000 || Kitt Peak || Spacewatch ||  || align=right | 2.4 km || 
|-id=063 bgcolor=#E9E9E9
| 524063 ||  || — || March 3, 2000 || Socorro || LINEAR ||  || align=right | 1.1 km || 
|-id=064 bgcolor=#d6d6d6
| 524064 ||  || — || March 3, 2000 || Socorro || LINEAR ||  || align=right | 2.9 km || 
|-id=065 bgcolor=#fefefe
| 524065 ||  || — || March 12, 2000 || Kitt Peak || Spacewatch ||  || align=right data-sort-value="0.87" | 870 m || 
|-id=066 bgcolor=#d6d6d6
| 524066 ||  || — || March 12, 2000 || Kitt Peak || Spacewatch ||  || align=right | 2.5 km || 
|-id=067 bgcolor=#d6d6d6
| 524067 ||  || — || March 3, 2000 || Kitt Peak || Spacewatch ||  || align=right | 2.2 km || 
|-id=068 bgcolor=#fefefe
| 524068 ||  || — || March 25, 2000 || Kitt Peak || Spacewatch ||  || align=right data-sort-value="0.87" | 870 m || 
|-id=069 bgcolor=#d6d6d6
| 524069 ||  || — || March 27, 2000 || Kitt Peak || Spacewatch ||  || align=right | 2.8 km || 
|-id=070 bgcolor=#fefefe
| 524070 ||  || — || March 29, 2000 || Kitt Peak || Spacewatch ||  || align=right data-sort-value="0.69" | 690 m || 
|-id=071 bgcolor=#E9E9E9
| 524071 ||  || — || April 5, 2000 || Socorro || LINEAR ||  || align=right | 3.0 km || 
|-id=072 bgcolor=#fefefe
| 524072 ||  || — || April 5, 2000 || Socorro || LINEAR ||  || align=right data-sort-value="0.99" | 990 m || 
|-id=073 bgcolor=#fefefe
| 524073 ||  || — || April 5, 2000 || Socorro || LINEAR ||  || align=right data-sort-value="0.84" | 840 m || 
|-id=074 bgcolor=#E9E9E9
| 524074 ||  || — || April 5, 2000 || Kitt Peak || Spacewatch ||  || align=right | 2.8 km || 
|-id=075 bgcolor=#fefefe
| 524075 ||  || — || March 27, 2000 || Kitt Peak || Spacewatch ||  || align=right data-sort-value="0.74" | 740 m || 
|-id=076 bgcolor=#d6d6d6
| 524076 ||  || — || April 7, 2000 || Kitt Peak || Spacewatch ||  || align=right | 2.6 km || 
|-id=077 bgcolor=#fefefe
| 524077 ||  || — || April 5, 2000 || Socorro || LINEAR ||  || align=right data-sort-value="0.97" | 970 m || 
|-id=078 bgcolor=#fefefe
| 524078 ||  || — || March 25, 2000 || Kitt Peak || Spacewatch ||  || align=right data-sort-value="0.74" | 740 m || 
|-id=079 bgcolor=#d6d6d6
| 524079 ||  || — || April 1, 2000 || Kitt Peak || Spacewatch ||  || align=right | 2.8 km || 
|-id=080 bgcolor=#d6d6d6
| 524080 ||  || — || April 2, 2000 || Kitt Peak || Spacewatch ||  || align=right | 4.2 km || 
|-id=081 bgcolor=#d6d6d6
| 524081 ||  || — || April 2, 2000 || Kitt Peak || Spacewatch ||  || align=right | 2.8 km || 
|-id=082 bgcolor=#E9E9E9
| 524082 ||  || — || April 24, 2000 || Kitt Peak || Spacewatch ||  || align=right | 1.0 km || 
|-id=083 bgcolor=#d6d6d6
| 524083 ||  || — || April 24, 2000 || Kitt Peak || Spacewatch ||  || align=right | 2.8 km || 
|-id=084 bgcolor=#d6d6d6
| 524084 ||  || — || April 30, 2000 || Kitt Peak || Spacewatch ||  || align=right | 2.5 km || 
|-id=085 bgcolor=#E9E9E9
| 524085 ||  || — || April 29, 2000 || Socorro || LINEAR ||  || align=right | 1.3 km || 
|-id=086 bgcolor=#d6d6d6
| 524086 ||  || — || May 9, 2000 || Kitt Peak || Spacewatch ||  || align=right | 2.5 km || 
|-id=087 bgcolor=#fefefe
| 524087 ||  || — || May 28, 2000 || Socorro || LINEAR ||  || align=right | 1.1 km || 
|-id=088 bgcolor=#fefefe
| 524088 ||  || — || May 27, 2000 || Socorro || LINEAR ||  || align=right | 1.2 km || 
|-id=089 bgcolor=#d6d6d6
| 524089 ||  || — || May 24, 2000 || Kitt Peak || Spacewatch ||  || align=right | 2.9 km || 
|-id=090 bgcolor=#fefefe
| 524090 ||  || — || May 28, 2000 || Kitt Peak || Spacewatch ||  || align=right data-sort-value="0.68" | 680 m || 
|-id=091 bgcolor=#E9E9E9
| 524091 ||  || — || July 2, 2000 || Kitt Peak || Spacewatch ||  || align=right | 2.0 km || 
|-id=092 bgcolor=#d6d6d6
| 524092 ||  || — || July 28, 2000 || Prescott || P. G. Comba ||  || align=right | 3.2 km || 
|-id=093 bgcolor=#FA8072
| 524093 ||  || — || August 1, 2000 || Socorro || LINEAR ||  || align=right | 1.5 km || 
|-id=094 bgcolor=#E9E9E9
| 524094 ||  || — || August 26, 2000 || Socorro || LINEAR ||  || align=right | 2.1 km || 
|-id=095 bgcolor=#FA8072
| 524095 ||  || — || August 25, 2000 || Socorro || LINEAR ||  || align=right data-sort-value="0.78" | 780 m || 
|-id=096 bgcolor=#E9E9E9
| 524096 ||  || — || August 24, 2000 || Socorro || LINEAR ||  || align=right | 1.2 km || 
|-id=097 bgcolor=#E9E9E9
| 524097 ||  || — || August 26, 2000 || Socorro || LINEAR ||  || align=right | 1.4 km || 
|-id=098 bgcolor=#FA8072
| 524098 ||  || — || August 24, 2000 || Socorro || LINEAR ||  || align=right data-sort-value="0.72" | 720 m || 
|-id=099 bgcolor=#fefefe
| 524099 ||  || — || August 26, 2000 || Socorro || LINEAR ||  || align=right data-sort-value="0.62" | 620 m || 
|-id=100 bgcolor=#E9E9E9
| 524100 ||  || — || August 29, 2000 || Socorro || LINEAR ||  || align=right | 1.2 km || 
|}

524101–524200 

|-bgcolor=#fefefe
| 524101 ||  || — || August 24, 2000 || Socorro || LINEAR ||  || align=right | 1.1 km || 
|-id=102 bgcolor=#E9E9E9
| 524102 ||  || — || August 31, 2000 || Socorro || LINEAR ||  || align=right | 1.6 km || 
|-id=103 bgcolor=#E9E9E9
| 524103 ||  || — || August 31, 2000 || Socorro || LINEAR ||  || align=right | 2.2 km || 
|-id=104 bgcolor=#E9E9E9
| 524104 ||  || — || August 31, 2000 || Socorro || LINEAR ||  || align=right | 2.0 km || 
|-id=105 bgcolor=#d6d6d6
| 524105 ||  || — || August 30, 2000 || Kitt Peak || Spacewatch ||  || align=right | 3.0 km || 
|-id=106 bgcolor=#E9E9E9
| 524106 ||  || — || August 21, 2000 || Anderson Mesa || LONEOS ||  || align=right | 1.7 km || 
|-id=107 bgcolor=#fefefe
| 524107 ||  || — || August 29, 2000 || Socorro || LINEAR ||  || align=right data-sort-value="0.77" | 770 m || 
|-id=108 bgcolor=#E9E9E9
| 524108 ||  || — || August 20, 2000 || Kitt Peak || Spacewatch ||  || align=right | 1.1 km || 
|-id=109 bgcolor=#fefefe
| 524109 ||  || — || August 21, 2000 || Anderson Mesa || LONEOS ||  || align=right data-sort-value="0.75" | 750 m || 
|-id=110 bgcolor=#fefefe
| 524110 ||  || — || September 2, 2000 || Prescott || P. G. Comba ||  || align=right data-sort-value="0.85" | 850 m || 
|-id=111 bgcolor=#d6d6d6
| 524111 ||  || — || September 7, 2000 || Kitt Peak || Spacewatch ||  || align=right | 3.0 km || 
|-id=112 bgcolor=#E9E9E9
| 524112 ||  || — || September 9, 2000 || Ondřejov || L. Kotková ||  || align=right | 1.1 km || 
|-id=113 bgcolor=#fefefe
| 524113 ||  || — || November 25, 2011 || Haleakala || Pan-STARRS ||  || align=right data-sort-value="0.87" | 870 m || 
|-id=114 bgcolor=#B88A00
| 524114 ||  || — || September 18, 2000 || Socorro || LINEAR || unusual || align=right | 5.6 km || 
|-id=115 bgcolor=#FA8072
| 524115 ||  || — || September 23, 2000 || Socorro || LINEAR ||  || align=right data-sort-value="0.77" | 770 m || 
|-id=116 bgcolor=#E9E9E9
| 524116 ||  || — || September 23, 2000 || Socorro || LINEAR ||  || align=right | 1.6 km || 
|-id=117 bgcolor=#E9E9E9
| 524117 ||  || — || September 23, 2000 || Socorro || LINEAR ||  || align=right | 2.2 km || 
|-id=118 bgcolor=#fefefe
| 524118 ||  || — || September 23, 2000 || Socorro || LINEAR ||  || align=right | 1.4 km || 
|-id=119 bgcolor=#d6d6d6
| 524119 ||  || — || September 24, 2000 || Socorro || LINEAR ||  || align=right | 3.6 km || 
|-id=120 bgcolor=#FA8072
| 524120 ||  || — || September 1, 2000 || Socorro || LINEAR ||  || align=right data-sort-value="0.78" | 780 m || 
|-id=121 bgcolor=#E9E9E9
| 524121 ||  || — || September 23, 2000 || Socorro || LINEAR ||  || align=right | 1.2 km || 
|-id=122 bgcolor=#E9E9E9
| 524122 ||  || — || September 23, 2000 || Socorro || LINEAR ||  || align=right | 1.5 km || 
|-id=123 bgcolor=#E9E9E9
| 524123 ||  || — || September 22, 2000 || Socorro || LINEAR ||  || align=right | 1.7 km || 
|-id=124 bgcolor=#E9E9E9
| 524124 ||  || — || September 22, 2000 || Socorro || LINEAR ||  || align=right | 1.9 km || 
|-id=125 bgcolor=#E9E9E9
| 524125 ||  || — || September 23, 2000 || Socorro || LINEAR ||  || align=right | 1.7 km || 
|-id=126 bgcolor=#E9E9E9
| 524126 ||  || — || September 21, 2000 || Socorro || LINEAR ||  || align=right | 1.9 km || 
|-id=127 bgcolor=#E9E9E9
| 524127 ||  || — || September 22, 2000 || Anderson Mesa || LONEOS ||  || align=right | 1.6 km || 
|-id=128 bgcolor=#E9E9E9
| 524128 ||  || — || September 24, 2000 || Socorro || LINEAR ||  || align=right | 1.1 km || 
|-id=129 bgcolor=#E9E9E9
| 524129 ||  || — || September 24, 2000 || Socorro || LINEAR ||  || align=right | 2.0 km || 
|-id=130 bgcolor=#E9E9E9
| 524130 ||  || — || September 29, 2000 || Kitt Peak || Spacewatch ||  || align=right | 1.6 km || 
|-id=131 bgcolor=#E9E9E9
| 524131 ||  || — || September 24, 2000 || Kitt Peak || Spacewatch ||  || align=right | 1.3 km || 
|-id=132 bgcolor=#E9E9E9
| 524132 ||  || — || September 24, 2000 || Kitt Peak || Spacewatch ||  || align=right | 1.7 km || 
|-id=133 bgcolor=#fefefe
| 524133 ||  || — || September 20, 2000 || Kitt Peak || M. W. Buie ||  || align=right data-sort-value="0.58" | 580 m || 
|-id=134 bgcolor=#E9E9E9
| 524134 ||  || — || September 29, 2000 || Anderson Mesa || LONEOS ||  || align=right | 1.3 km || 
|-id=135 bgcolor=#fefefe
| 524135 ||  || — || September 22, 2000 || Anderson Mesa || LONEOS ||  || align=right data-sort-value="0.77" | 770 m || 
|-id=136 bgcolor=#FA8072
| 524136 ||  || — || September 28, 2000 || Socorro || LINEAR ||  || align=right data-sort-value="0.71" | 710 m || 
|-id=137 bgcolor=#E9E9E9
| 524137 ||  || — || October 1, 2000 || Socorro || LINEAR ||  || align=right | 1.8 km || 
|-id=138 bgcolor=#E9E9E9
| 524138 ||  || — || October 4, 2000 || Socorro || LINEAR ||  || align=right | 1.8 km || 
|-id=139 bgcolor=#E9E9E9
| 524139 ||  || — || October 3, 2000 || Kitt Peak || Spacewatch ||  || align=right | 1.2 km || 
|-id=140 bgcolor=#d6d6d6
| 524140 ||  || — || October 4, 2000 || Kitt Peak || Spacewatch ||  || align=right | 2.7 km || 
|-id=141 bgcolor=#E9E9E9
| 524141 ||  || — || October 18, 2000 || Kitt Peak || Spacewatch ||  || align=right | 1.8 km || 
|-id=142 bgcolor=#E9E9E9
| 524142 ||  || — || October 25, 2000 || Kitt Peak || Spacewatch ||  || align=right data-sort-value="0.72" | 720 m || 
|-id=143 bgcolor=#E9E9E9
| 524143 ||  || — || October 3, 2000 || Socorro || LINEAR ||  || align=right | 1.3 km || 
|-id=144 bgcolor=#E9E9E9
| 524144 ||  || — || October 25, 2000 || Socorro || LINEAR ||  || align=right | 2.7 km || 
|-id=145 bgcolor=#E9E9E9
| 524145 ||  || — || November 1, 2000 || Socorro || LINEAR ||  || align=right | 1.7 km || 
|-id=146 bgcolor=#E9E9E9
| 524146 ||  || — || November 1, 2000 || Socorro || LINEAR ||  || align=right | 1.3 km || 
|-id=147 bgcolor=#d6d6d6
| 524147 ||  || — || November 5, 2000 || Kitt Peak || Spacewatch ||  || align=right | 3.3 km || 
|-id=148 bgcolor=#fefefe
| 524148 ||  || — || November 19, 2000 || Socorro || LINEAR || H || align=right data-sort-value="0.85" | 850 m || 
|-id=149 bgcolor=#E9E9E9
| 524149 ||  || — || November 19, 2000 || Socorro || LINEAR ||  || align=right | 1.6 km || 
|-id=150 bgcolor=#FFC2E0
| 524150 ||  || — || November 19, 2000 || Anderson Mesa || LONEOS || AMO || align=right data-sort-value="0.31" | 310 m || 
|-id=151 bgcolor=#E9E9E9
| 524151 ||  || — || November 20, 2000 || Socorro || LINEAR ||  || align=right | 1.9 km || 
|-id=152 bgcolor=#d6d6d6
| 524152 ||  || — || November 27, 2000 || Kitt Peak || Spacewatch ||  || align=right | 2.1 km || 
|-id=153 bgcolor=#fefefe
| 524153 ||  || — || October 7, 2000 || Anderson Mesa || LONEOS ||  || align=right data-sort-value="0.70" | 700 m || 
|-id=154 bgcolor=#E9E9E9
| 524154 ||  || — || November 24, 2000 || Kitt Peak || Spacewatch ||  || align=right data-sort-value="0.99" | 990 m || 
|-id=155 bgcolor=#d6d6d6
| 524155 ||  || — || November 24, 2000 || Kitt Peak || Spacewatch ||  || align=right | 2.8 km || 
|-id=156 bgcolor=#fefefe
| 524156 ||  || — || November 24, 2000 || Kitt Peak || Spacewatch ||  || align=right data-sort-value="0.93" | 930 m || 
|-id=157 bgcolor=#E9E9E9
| 524157 ||  || — || November 25, 2000 || Kitt Peak || Spacewatch ||  || align=right | 2.8 km || 
|-id=158 bgcolor=#fefefe
| 524158 ||  || — || November 28, 2000 || Kitt Peak || Spacewatch ||  || align=right data-sort-value="0.63" | 630 m || 
|-id=159 bgcolor=#fefefe
| 524159 ||  || — || November 27, 2000 || Kitt Peak || Spacewatch || H || align=right data-sort-value="0.80" | 800 m || 
|-id=160 bgcolor=#fefefe
| 524160 ||  || — || November 28, 2000 || Kitt Peak || Spacewatch ||  || align=right data-sort-value="0.83" | 830 m || 
|-id=161 bgcolor=#d6d6d6
| 524161 ||  || — || November 2, 2000 || Kitt Peak || Spacewatch ||  || align=right | 3.2 km || 
|-id=162 bgcolor=#E9E9E9
| 524162 ||  || — || November 29, 2000 || Kitt Peak || Spacewatch ||  || align=right | 1.8 km || 
|-id=163 bgcolor=#fefefe
| 524163 ||  || — || December 1, 2000 || Kitt Peak || Spacewatch ||  || align=right data-sort-value="0.50" | 500 m || 
|-id=164 bgcolor=#E9E9E9
| 524164 ||  || — || December 18, 2000 || Kitt Peak || Spacewatch ||  || align=right | 2.1 km || 
|-id=165 bgcolor=#E9E9E9
| 524165 ||  || — || December 21, 2000 || Kitt Peak || Spacewatch ||  || align=right | 1.8 km || 
|-id=166 bgcolor=#fefefe
| 524166 ||  || — || December 28, 2000 || Kitt Peak || Spacewatch ||  || align=right data-sort-value="0.53" | 530 m || 
|-id=167 bgcolor=#d6d6d6
| 524167 ||  || — || November 27, 2000 || Socorro || LINEAR || 7:4* || align=right | 3.1 km || 
|-id=168 bgcolor=#fefefe
| 524168 ||  || — || December 25, 2000 || Kitt Peak || Spacewatch ||  || align=right | 1.2 km || 
|-id=169 bgcolor=#E9E9E9
| 524169 ||  || — || January 2, 2001 || Kitt Peak || Spacewatch ||  || align=right | 2.0 km || 
|-id=170 bgcolor=#E9E9E9
| 524170 ||  || — || January 21, 2001 || Socorro || LINEAR ||  || align=right | 2.2 km || 
|-id=171 bgcolor=#fefefe
| 524171 ||  || — || January 20, 2001 || Kitt Peak || Spacewatch ||  || align=right data-sort-value="0.75" | 750 m || 
|-id=172 bgcolor=#fefefe
| 524172 ||  || — || February 13, 2001 || Kitt Peak || Spacewatch ||  || align=right | 1.1 km || 
|-id=173 bgcolor=#fefefe
| 524173 ||  || — || February 19, 2001 || Socorro || LINEAR ||  || align=right data-sort-value="0.89" | 890 m || 
|-id=174 bgcolor=#d6d6d6
| 524174 ||  || — || February 19, 2001 || Socorro || LINEAR ||  || align=right | 4.1 km || 
|-id=175 bgcolor=#E9E9E9
| 524175 ||  || — || February 22, 2001 || Kitt Peak || Spacewatch ||  || align=right | 1.5 km || 
|-id=176 bgcolor=#fefefe
| 524176 ||  || — || March 22, 2001 || Kitt Peak || Spacewatch ||  || align=right data-sort-value="0.66" | 660 m || 
|-id=177 bgcolor=#fefefe
| 524177 ||  || — || March 26, 2001 || Kitt Peak || Spacewatch ||  || align=right data-sort-value="0.63" | 630 m || 
|-id=178 bgcolor=#fefefe
| 524178 ||  || — || March 26, 2001 || Kitt Peak || Spacewatch ||  || align=right data-sort-value="0.75" | 750 m || 
|-id=179 bgcolor=#C2E0FF
| 524179 ||  || — || March 26, 2001 || Kitt Peak || M. W. Buie || twotinocritical || align=right | 185 km || 
|-id=180 bgcolor=#E9E9E9
| 524180 ||  || — || March 19, 2001 || Anderson Mesa || LONEOS ||  || align=right | 2.8 km || 
|-id=181 bgcolor=#d6d6d6
| 524181 ||  || — || March 4, 2013 || Haleakala || Pan-STARRS ||  || align=right | 2.4 km || 
|-id=182 bgcolor=#E9E9E9
| 524182 ||  || — || April 18, 2001 || Kitt Peak || Spacewatch ||  || align=right | 2.4 km || 
|-id=183 bgcolor=#E9E9E9
| 524183 ||  || — || April 27, 2001 || Kitt Peak || Spacewatch ||  || align=right | 1.8 km || 
|-id=184 bgcolor=#fefefe
| 524184 ||  || — || April 16, 2001 || Kitt Peak || Spacewatch ||  || align=right data-sort-value="0.90" | 900 m || 
|-id=185 bgcolor=#FA8072
| 524185 ||  || — || May 22, 2001 || Anderson Mesa || LONEOS ||  || align=right data-sort-value="0.98" | 980 m || 
|-id=186 bgcolor=#d6d6d6
| 524186 ||  || — || May 26, 2001 || Kitt Peak || Spacewatch ||  || align=right | 2.9 km || 
|-id=187 bgcolor=#FA8072
| 524187 ||  || — || July 26, 2001 || Palomar || NEAT ||  || align=right data-sort-value="0.65" | 650 m || 
|-id=188 bgcolor=#fefefe
| 524188 ||  || — || August 14, 2001 || Haleakala || NEAT ||  || align=right data-sort-value="0.72" | 720 m || 
|-id=189 bgcolor=#fefefe
| 524189 ||  || — || August 1, 2001 || Palomar || NEAT ||  || align=right data-sort-value="0.72" | 720 m || 
|-id=190 bgcolor=#E9E9E9
| 524190 ||  || — || August 16, 2001 || Socorro || LINEAR ||  || align=right data-sort-value="0.90" | 900 m || 
|-id=191 bgcolor=#E9E9E9
| 524191 ||  || — || August 21, 2001 || Kitt Peak || Spacewatch ||  || align=right | 1.0 km || 
|-id=192 bgcolor=#E9E9E9
| 524192 ||  || — || August 20, 2001 || Socorro || LINEAR ||  || align=right | 1.7 km || 
|-id=193 bgcolor=#d6d6d6
| 524193 ||  || — || August 24, 2001 || Kitt Peak || Spacewatch || 3:2 || align=right | 4.4 km || 
|-id=194 bgcolor=#E9E9E9
| 524194 ||  || — || August 26, 2001 || Socorro || LINEAR ||  || align=right | 1.2 km || 
|-id=195 bgcolor=#E9E9E9
| 524195 ||  || — || August 16, 2001 || Socorro || LINEAR ||  || align=right | 1.4 km || 
|-id=196 bgcolor=#FFC2E0
| 524196 ||  || — || August 31, 2001 || Palomar || NEAT || AMO || align=right data-sort-value="0.67" | 670 m || 
|-id=197 bgcolor=#fefefe
| 524197 ||  || — || August 23, 2001 || Anderson Mesa || LONEOS ||  || align=right data-sort-value="0.84" | 840 m || 
|-id=198 bgcolor=#FA8072
| 524198 ||  || — || August 19, 2001 || Socorro || LINEAR ||  || align=right data-sort-value="0.60" | 600 m || 
|-id=199 bgcolor=#E9E9E9
| 524199 ||  || — || September 10, 2001 || Socorro || LINEAR ||  || align=right data-sort-value="0.68" | 680 m || 
|-id=200 bgcolor=#E9E9E9
| 524200 ||  || — || August 16, 2001 || Socorro || LINEAR ||  || align=right | 1.5 km || 
|}

524201–524300 

|-bgcolor=#FA8072
| 524201 ||  || — || July 21, 2001 || Kitt Peak || Spacewatch ||  || align=right data-sort-value="0.57" | 570 m || 
|-id=202 bgcolor=#E9E9E9
| 524202 ||  || — || September 11, 2001 || Socorro || LINEAR ||  || align=right | 1.0 km || 
|-id=203 bgcolor=#FA8072
| 524203 ||  || — || September 11, 2001 || Socorro || LINEAR || unusual || align=right | 1.5 km || 
|-id=204 bgcolor=#FA8072
| 524204 ||  || — || September 12, 2001 || Socorro || LINEAR ||  || align=right | 1.0 km || 
|-id=205 bgcolor=#E9E9E9
| 524205 ||  || — || September 12, 2001 || Socorro || LINEAR ||  || align=right | 1.4 km || 
|-id=206 bgcolor=#fefefe
| 524206 ||  || — || September 12, 2001 || Socorro || LINEAR ||  || align=right data-sort-value="0.98" | 980 m || 
|-id=207 bgcolor=#FA8072
| 524207 ||  || — || September 11, 2001 || Anderson Mesa || LONEOS ||  || align=right data-sort-value="0.80" | 800 m || 
|-id=208 bgcolor=#fefefe
| 524208 ||  || — || September 12, 2001 || Kitt Peak || Spacewatch ||  || align=right data-sort-value="0.71" | 710 m || 
|-id=209 bgcolor=#E9E9E9
| 524209 ||  || — || September 12, 2001 || Socorro || LINEAR ||  || align=right data-sort-value="0.89" | 890 m || 
|-id=210 bgcolor=#d6d6d6
| 524210 ||  || — || August 25, 2001 || Socorro || LINEAR ||  || align=right | 2.9 km || 
|-id=211 bgcolor=#E9E9E9
| 524211 ||  || — || September 12, 2001 || Socorro || LINEAR ||  || align=right data-sort-value="0.78" | 780 m || 
|-id=212 bgcolor=#E9E9E9
| 524212 ||  || — || August 25, 2001 || Anderson Mesa || LONEOS || ADE || align=right | 2.2 km || 
|-id=213 bgcolor=#d6d6d6
| 524213 ||  || — || September 12, 2001 || Socorro || LINEAR ||  || align=right | 2.5 km || 
|-id=214 bgcolor=#fefefe
| 524214 ||  || — || August 24, 2001 || Socorro || LINEAR || (883) || align=right data-sort-value="0.73" | 730 m || 
|-id=215 bgcolor=#fefefe
| 524215 ||  || — || September 12, 2001 || Socorro || LINEAR ||  || align=right data-sort-value="0.88" | 880 m || 
|-id=216 bgcolor=#C2E0FF
| 524216 ||  || — || September 12, 2001 || Kitt Peak || M. W. Buie || plutino || align=right | 233 km || 
|-id=217 bgcolor=#C2E0FF
| 524217 ||  || — || September 12, 2001 || Kitt Peak || M. W. Buie || cubewano (cold)moon || align=right | 205 km || 
|-id=218 bgcolor=#fefefe
| 524218 ||  || — || September 16, 2001 || Socorro || LINEAR ||  || align=right data-sort-value="0.54" | 540 m || 
|-id=219 bgcolor=#fefefe
| 524219 ||  || — || September 20, 2001 || Socorro || LINEAR ||  || align=right data-sort-value="0.77" | 770 m || 
|-id=220 bgcolor=#E9E9E9
| 524220 ||  || — || August 23, 2001 || Anderson Mesa || LONEOS ||  || align=right | 1.3 km || 
|-id=221 bgcolor=#E9E9E9
| 524221 ||  || — || September 11, 2001 || Anderson Mesa || LONEOS ||  || align=right | 1.6 km || 
|-id=222 bgcolor=#E9E9E9
| 524222 ||  || — || September 20, 2001 || Desert Eagle || W. K. Y. Yeung ||  || align=right | 1.3 km || 
|-id=223 bgcolor=#E9E9E9
| 524223 ||  || — || September 17, 2001 || Socorro || LINEAR ||  || align=right | 1.5 km || 
|-id=224 bgcolor=#E9E9E9
| 524224 ||  || — || September 16, 2001 || Socorro || LINEAR ||  || align=right | 1.1 km || 
|-id=225 bgcolor=#d6d6d6
| 524225 ||  || — || September 19, 2001 || Socorro || LINEAR ||  || align=right | 3.0 km || 
|-id=226 bgcolor=#fefefe
| 524226 ||  || — || August 24, 2001 || Kitt Peak || Spacewatch ||  || align=right data-sort-value="0.63" | 630 m || 
|-id=227 bgcolor=#fefefe
| 524227 ||  || — || August 27, 2001 || Kitt Peak || Spacewatch ||  || align=right data-sort-value="0.62" | 620 m || 
|-id=228 bgcolor=#d6d6d6
| 524228 ||  || — || August 25, 2001 || Kitt Peak || Spacewatch ||  || align=right | 1.9 km || 
|-id=229 bgcolor=#d6d6d6
| 524229 ||  || — || September 19, 2001 || Socorro || LINEAR ||  || align=right | 1.8 km || 
|-id=230 bgcolor=#fefefe
| 524230 ||  || — || September 19, 2001 || Socorro || LINEAR ||  || align=right data-sort-value="0.54" | 540 m || 
|-id=231 bgcolor=#E9E9E9
| 524231 ||  || — || September 19, 2001 || Socorro || LINEAR ||  || align=right | 1.4 km || 
|-id=232 bgcolor=#fefefe
| 524232 ||  || — || September 19, 2001 || Socorro || LINEAR ||  || align=right data-sort-value="0.65" | 650 m || 
|-id=233 bgcolor=#fefefe
| 524233 ||  || — || September 19, 2001 || Socorro || LINEAR ||  || align=right data-sort-value="0.60" | 600 m || 
|-id=234 bgcolor=#d6d6d6
| 524234 ||  || — || September 19, 2001 || Socorro || LINEAR ||  || align=right | 2.8 km || 
|-id=235 bgcolor=#d6d6d6
| 524235 ||  || — || September 19, 2001 || Socorro || LINEAR ||  || align=right | 3.1 km || 
|-id=236 bgcolor=#E9E9E9
| 524236 ||  || — || September 19, 2001 || Socorro || LINEAR ||  || align=right | 2.0 km || 
|-id=237 bgcolor=#E9E9E9
| 524237 ||  || — || September 19, 2001 || Socorro || LINEAR ||  || align=right data-sort-value="0.95" | 950 m || 
|-id=238 bgcolor=#FA8072
| 524238 ||  || — || September 12, 2001 || Socorro || LINEAR ||  || align=right | 1.9 km || 
|-id=239 bgcolor=#E9E9E9
| 524239 ||  || — || September 19, 2001 || Socorro || LINEAR ||  || align=right data-sort-value="0.95" | 950 m || 
|-id=240 bgcolor=#d6d6d6
| 524240 ||  || — || September 19, 2001 || Socorro || LINEAR ||  || align=right | 2.7 km || 
|-id=241 bgcolor=#E9E9E9
| 524241 ||  || — || September 19, 2001 || Socorro || LINEAR ||  || align=right | 1.3 km || 
|-id=242 bgcolor=#d6d6d6
| 524242 ||  || — || September 20, 2001 || Socorro || LINEAR ||  || align=right | 3.0 km || 
|-id=243 bgcolor=#E9E9E9
| 524243 ||  || — || September 19, 2001 || Kitt Peak || Spacewatch ||  || align=right | 1.0 km || 
|-id=244 bgcolor=#E9E9E9
| 524244 ||  || — || September 16, 2001 || Socorro || LINEAR ||  || align=right data-sort-value="0.90" | 900 m || 
|-id=245 bgcolor=#fefefe
| 524245 ||  || — || September 19, 2001 || Kitt Peak || Spacewatch ||  || align=right data-sort-value="0.68" | 680 m || 
|-id=246 bgcolor=#d6d6d6
| 524246 ||  || — || September 20, 2001 || Socorro || LINEAR ||  || align=right | 2.7 km || 
|-id=247 bgcolor=#E9E9E9
| 524247 ||  || — || September 20, 2001 || Socorro || LINEAR ||  || align=right | 1.2 km || 
|-id=248 bgcolor=#d6d6d6
| 524248 ||  || — || September 20, 2001 || Socorro || LINEAR ||  || align=right | 2.0 km || 
|-id=249 bgcolor=#d6d6d6
| 524249 ||  || — || September 12, 2001 || Kitt Peak || Spacewatch ||  || align=right | 3.4 km || 
|-id=250 bgcolor=#E9E9E9
| 524250 ||  || — || September 19, 2001 || Socorro || LINEAR ||  || align=right | 1.3 km || 
|-id=251 bgcolor=#E9E9E9
| 524251 ||  || — || September 21, 2001 || Socorro || LINEAR ||  || align=right | 1.0 km || 
|-id=252 bgcolor=#fefefe
| 524252 ||  || — || September 11, 2001 || Kitt Peak || Spacewatch ||  || align=right data-sort-value="0.72" | 720 m || 
|-id=253 bgcolor=#d6d6d6
| 524253 ||  || — || August 25, 2001 || Kitt Peak || Spacewatch ||  || align=right | 3.1 km || 
|-id=254 bgcolor=#E9E9E9
| 524254 ||  || — || September 19, 2001 || Kitt Peak || Spacewatch ||  || align=right data-sort-value="0.87" | 870 m || 
|-id=255 bgcolor=#fefefe
| 524255 ||  || — || September 20, 2001 || Socorro || LINEAR || H || align=right data-sort-value="0.60" | 600 m || 
|-id=256 bgcolor=#d6d6d6
| 524256 ||  || — || August 25, 2001 || Kitt Peak || Spacewatch ||  || align=right | 2.7 km || 
|-id=257 bgcolor=#d6d6d6
| 524257 ||  || — || September 20, 2001 || Socorro || LINEAR ||  || align=right | 2.6 km || 
|-id=258 bgcolor=#fefefe
| 524258 ||  || — || September 20, 2001 || Socorro || LINEAR ||  || align=right data-sort-value="0.53" | 530 m || 
|-id=259 bgcolor=#E9E9E9
| 524259 ||  || — || September 22, 2001 || Kitt Peak || Spacewatch ||  || align=right data-sort-value="0.91" | 910 m || 
|-id=260 bgcolor=#E9E9E9
| 524260 ||  || — || September 27, 2001 || Socorro || LINEAR ||  || align=right | 1.1 km || 
|-id=261 bgcolor=#fefefe
| 524261 ||  || — || September 29, 2005 || Kitt Peak || Spacewatch ||  || align=right data-sort-value="0.90" | 900 m || 
|-id=262 bgcolor=#d6d6d6
| 524262 ||  || — || August 27, 2001 || Kitt Peak || Spacewatch ||  || align=right | 2.8 km || 
|-id=263 bgcolor=#E9E9E9
| 524263 ||  || — || October 7, 2001 || Palomar || NEAT ||  || align=right | 1.0 km || 
|-id=264 bgcolor=#E9E9E9
| 524264 ||  || — || September 12, 2001 || Socorro || LINEAR ||  || align=right | 1.0 km || 
|-id=265 bgcolor=#E9E9E9
| 524265 ||  || — || September 20, 2001 || Socorro || LINEAR ||  || align=right | 1.1 km || 
|-id=266 bgcolor=#E9E9E9
| 524266 ||  || — || October 14, 2001 || Socorro || LINEAR ||  || align=right data-sort-value="0.94" | 940 m || 
|-id=267 bgcolor=#fefefe
| 524267 ||  || — || October 14, 2001 || Socorro || LINEAR ||  || align=right data-sort-value="0.54" | 540 m || 
|-id=268 bgcolor=#FFC2E0
| 524268 ||  || — || October 15, 2001 || Socorro || LINEAR || APOPHA || align=right data-sort-value="0.37" | 370 m || 
|-id=269 bgcolor=#E9E9E9
| 524269 ||  || — || October 13, 2001 || Socorro || LINEAR ||  || align=right | 1.2 km || 
|-id=270 bgcolor=#E9E9E9
| 524270 ||  || — || October 15, 2001 || Socorro || LINEAR ||  || align=right | 1.6 km || 
|-id=271 bgcolor=#E9E9E9
| 524271 ||  || — || October 13, 2001 || Socorro || LINEAR ||  || align=right | 1.1 km || 
|-id=272 bgcolor=#E9E9E9
| 524272 ||  || — || September 11, 2001 || Anderson Mesa || LONEOS ||  || align=right | 1.1 km || 
|-id=273 bgcolor=#E9E9E9
| 524273 ||  || — || October 14, 2001 || Socorro || LINEAR ||  || align=right data-sort-value="0.86" | 860 m || 
|-id=274 bgcolor=#d6d6d6
| 524274 ||  || — || October 14, 2001 || Socorro || LINEAR ||  || align=right | 2.8 km || 
|-id=275 bgcolor=#d6d6d6
| 524275 ||  || — || October 14, 2001 || Kitt Peak || Spacewatch ||  || align=right | 3.8 km || 
|-id=276 bgcolor=#d6d6d6
| 524276 ||  || — || September 22, 2001 || Kitt Peak || Spacewatch ||  || align=right | 1.9 km || 
|-id=277 bgcolor=#E9E9E9
| 524277 ||  || — || October 11, 2001 || Palomar || NEAT ||  || align=right data-sort-value="0.94" | 940 m || 
|-id=278 bgcolor=#E9E9E9
| 524278 ||  || — || September 12, 2001 || Kitt Peak || Spacewatch ||  || align=right | 1.3 km || 
|-id=279 bgcolor=#d6d6d6
| 524279 ||  || — || September 21, 2001 || Socorro || LINEAR ||  || align=right | 2.7 km || 
|-id=280 bgcolor=#E9E9E9
| 524280 ||  || — || October 14, 2001 || Socorro || LINEAR ||  || align=right data-sort-value="0.94" | 940 m || 
|-id=281 bgcolor=#fefefe
| 524281 ||  || — || October 14, 2001 || Socorro || LINEAR ||  || align=right data-sort-value="0.68" | 680 m || 
|-id=282 bgcolor=#E9E9E9
| 524282 ||  || — || October 14, 2001 || Socorro || LINEAR ||  || align=right data-sort-value="0.90" | 900 m || 
|-id=283 bgcolor=#d6d6d6
| 524283 ||  || — || October 14, 2001 || Socorro || LINEAR ||  || align=right | 3.0 km || 
|-id=284 bgcolor=#E9E9E9
| 524284 ||  || — || October 14, 2001 || Socorro || LINEAR ||  || align=right | 1.7 km || 
|-id=285 bgcolor=#d6d6d6
| 524285 ||  || — || October 11, 2001 || Socorro || LINEAR ||  || align=right | 2.8 km || 
|-id=286 bgcolor=#fefefe
| 524286 ||  || — || October 12, 2001 || Campo Imperatore || CINEOS || H || align=right data-sort-value="0.46" | 460 m || 
|-id=287 bgcolor=#fefefe
| 524287 ||  || — || September 20, 2001 || Kitt Peak || Spacewatch ||  || align=right data-sort-value="0.79" | 790 m || 
|-id=288 bgcolor=#E9E9E9
| 524288 ||  || — || October 14, 2001 || Cima Ekar || ADAS ||  || align=right | 1.4 km || 
|-id=289 bgcolor=#d6d6d6
| 524289 ||  || — || October 14, 2001 || Apache Point || SDSS ||  || align=right | 1.9 km || 
|-id=290 bgcolor=#fefefe
| 524290 ||  || — || October 14, 2001 || Apache Point || SDSS ||  || align=right data-sort-value="0.52" | 520 m || 
|-id=291 bgcolor=#C2FFFF
| 524291 ||  || — || October 3, 2013 || Haleakala || Pan-STARRS || L5 || align=right | 6.8 km || 
|-id=292 bgcolor=#E9E9E9
| 524292 ||  || — || September 21, 2001 || Socorro || LINEAR ||  || align=right | 1.1 km || 
|-id=293 bgcolor=#E9E9E9
| 524293 ||  || — || October 18, 2001 || Socorro || LINEAR ||  || align=right | 1.2 km || 
|-id=294 bgcolor=#E9E9E9
| 524294 ||  || — || September 16, 2001 || Socorro || LINEAR ||  || align=right | 1.8 km || 
|-id=295 bgcolor=#E9E9E9
| 524295 ||  || — || October 17, 2001 || Socorro || LINEAR ||  || align=right | 1.1 km || 
|-id=296 bgcolor=#fefefe
| 524296 ||  || — || October 17, 2001 || Kitt Peak || Spacewatch ||  || align=right data-sort-value="0.66" | 660 m || 
|-id=297 bgcolor=#E9E9E9
| 524297 ||  || — || October 17, 2001 || Socorro || LINEAR ||  || align=right | 1.1 km || 
|-id=298 bgcolor=#E9E9E9
| 524298 ||  || — || October 16, 2001 || Socorro || LINEAR ||  || align=right | 1.8 km || 
|-id=299 bgcolor=#d6d6d6
| 524299 ||  || — || September 20, 2001 || Socorro || LINEAR || LIX || align=right | 3.3 km || 
|-id=300 bgcolor=#E9E9E9
| 524300 ||  || — || September 16, 2001 || Socorro || LINEAR ||  || align=right | 1.2 km || 
|}

524301–524400 

|-bgcolor=#fefefe
| 524301 ||  || — || October 22, 2001 || Socorro || LINEAR ||  || align=right data-sort-value="0.53" | 530 m || 
|-id=302 bgcolor=#E9E9E9
| 524302 ||  || — || September 25, 2001 || Socorro || LINEAR || JUN || align=right data-sort-value="0.97" | 970 m || 
|-id=303 bgcolor=#d6d6d6
| 524303 ||  || — || October 23, 2001 || Socorro || LINEAR ||  || align=right | 2.7 km || 
|-id=304 bgcolor=#fefefe
| 524304 ||  || — || October 23, 2001 || Socorro || LINEAR ||  || align=right data-sort-value="0.57" | 570 m || 
|-id=305 bgcolor=#d6d6d6
| 524305 ||  || — || October 16, 2001 || Kitt Peak || Spacewatch ||  || align=right | 2.9 km || 
|-id=306 bgcolor=#E9E9E9
| 524306 ||  || — || October 17, 2001 || Kitt Peak || Spacewatch ||  || align=right | 1.00 km || 
|-id=307 bgcolor=#d6d6d6
| 524307 ||  || — || October 21, 2001 || Socorro || LINEAR ||  || align=right | 3.4 km || 
|-id=308 bgcolor=#E9E9E9
| 524308 ||  || — || October 21, 2001 || Palomar || NEAT || BRG || align=right | 1.3 km || 
|-id=309 bgcolor=#E9E9E9
| 524309 ||  || — || November 7, 2001 || Socorro || LINEAR ||  || align=right | 1.7 km || 
|-id=310 bgcolor=#E9E9E9
| 524310 ||  || — || November 9, 2001 || Socorro || LINEAR ||  || align=right | 1.4 km || 
|-id=311 bgcolor=#E9E9E9
| 524311 ||  || — || November 9, 2001 || Socorro || LINEAR ||  || align=right | 1.6 km || 
|-id=312 bgcolor=#d6d6d6
| 524312 ||  || — || November 9, 2001 || Socorro || LINEAR || Tj (2.99) || align=right | 3.3 km || 
|-id=313 bgcolor=#d6d6d6
| 524313 ||  || — || October 18, 2001 || Socorro || LINEAR || THB || align=right | 3.5 km || 
|-id=314 bgcolor=#E9E9E9
| 524314 ||  || — || November 10, 2001 || Socorro || LINEAR ||  || align=right data-sort-value="0.89" | 890 m || 
|-id=315 bgcolor=#d6d6d6
| 524315 ||  || — || November 10, 2001 || Socorro || LINEAR || THB || align=right | 2.7 km || 
|-id=316 bgcolor=#d6d6d6
| 524316 ||  || — || October 17, 2001 || Kitt Peak || Spacewatch ||  || align=right | 2.7 km || 
|-id=317 bgcolor=#fefefe
| 524317 ||  || — || November 14, 2001 || Kitt Peak || Spacewatch ||  || align=right data-sort-value="0.58" | 580 m || 
|-id=318 bgcolor=#E9E9E9
| 524318 ||  || — || October 14, 2001 || Socorro || LINEAR ||  || align=right | 1.4 km || 
|-id=319 bgcolor=#E9E9E9
| 524319 ||  || — || November 12, 2001 || Socorro || LINEAR ||  || align=right | 1.5 km || 
|-id=320 bgcolor=#E9E9E9
| 524320 ||  || — || November 12, 2001 || Socorro || LINEAR ||  || align=right | 1.3 km || 
|-id=321 bgcolor=#E9E9E9
| 524321 ||  || — || November 12, 2001 || Socorro || LINEAR ||  || align=right data-sort-value="0.96" | 960 m || 
|-id=322 bgcolor=#fefefe
| 524322 ||  || — || November 12, 2001 || Socorro || LINEAR ||  || align=right data-sort-value="0.75" | 750 m || 
|-id=323 bgcolor=#d6d6d6
| 524323 ||  || — || November 16, 2001 || Kitt Peak || Spacewatch ||  || align=right | 3.0 km || 
|-id=324 bgcolor=#fefefe
| 524324 ||  || — || November 20, 2001 || Socorro || LINEAR || H || align=right data-sort-value="0.61" | 610 m || 
|-id=325 bgcolor=#fefefe
| 524325 ||  || — || November 17, 2001 || Socorro || LINEAR ||  || align=right data-sort-value="0.91" | 910 m || 
|-id=326 bgcolor=#d6d6d6
| 524326 ||  || — || October 19, 2001 || Kitt Peak || Spacewatch ||  || align=right | 2.6 km || 
|-id=327 bgcolor=#E9E9E9
| 524327 ||  || — || September 17, 2001 || Socorro || LINEAR ||  || align=right | 1.6 km || 
|-id=328 bgcolor=#d6d6d6
| 524328 ||  || — || November 17, 2001 || Socorro || LINEAR || Tj (2.98) || align=right | 2.9 km || 
|-id=329 bgcolor=#E9E9E9
| 524329 ||  || — || November 19, 2001 || Socorro || LINEAR ||  || align=right | 1.5 km || 
|-id=330 bgcolor=#d6d6d6
| 524330 ||  || — || October 18, 2001 || Kitt Peak || Spacewatch ||  || align=right | 2.7 km || 
|-id=331 bgcolor=#E9E9E9
| 524331 ||  || — || November 19, 2001 || Socorro || LINEAR ||  || align=right | 1.6 km || 
|-id=332 bgcolor=#d6d6d6
| 524332 ||  || — || November 20, 2001 || Socorro || LINEAR ||  || align=right | 3.3 km || 
|-id=333 bgcolor=#E9E9E9
| 524333 ||  || — || November 20, 2001 || Socorro || LINEAR ||  || align=right | 1.2 km || 
|-id=334 bgcolor=#E9E9E9
| 524334 ||  || — || November 20, 2001 || Socorro || LINEAR ||  || align=right | 1.5 km || 
|-id=335 bgcolor=#E9E9E9
| 524335 ||  || — || November 20, 2001 || Socorro || LINEAR ||  || align=right | 1.6 km || 
|-id=336 bgcolor=#fefefe
| 524336 ||  || — || November 19, 2001 || Anderson Mesa || LONEOS ||  || align=right data-sort-value="0.83" | 830 m || 
|-id=337 bgcolor=#d6d6d6
| 524337 ||  || — || November 19, 2001 || Socorro || LINEAR || Tj (2.96) || align=right | 3.0 km || 
|-id=338 bgcolor=#d6d6d6
| 524338 ||  || — || November 20, 2001 || Socorro || LINEAR ||  || align=right | 4.6 km || 
|-id=339 bgcolor=#FA8072
| 524339 ||  || — || December 8, 2001 || Socorro || LINEAR ||  || align=right | 1.7 km || 
|-id=340 bgcolor=#E9E9E9
| 524340 ||  || — || December 8, 2001 || Socorro || LINEAR ||  || align=right | 2.3 km || 
|-id=341 bgcolor=#d6d6d6
| 524341 ||  || — || December 8, 2001 || Socorro || LINEAR || Tj (2.97) || align=right | 4.2 km || 
|-id=342 bgcolor=#E9E9E9
| 524342 ||  || — || December 10, 2001 || Socorro || LINEAR || BAR || align=right | 1.5 km || 
|-id=343 bgcolor=#E9E9E9
| 524343 ||  || — || December 7, 2001 || Socorro || LINEAR || (1547) || align=right | 1.3 km || 
|-id=344 bgcolor=#d6d6d6
| 524344 ||  || — || December 9, 2001 || Socorro || LINEAR ||  || align=right | 3.0 km || 
|-id=345 bgcolor=#E9E9E9
| 524345 ||  || — || December 10, 2001 || Kitt Peak || Spacewatch ||  || align=right data-sort-value="0.74" | 740 m || 
|-id=346 bgcolor=#E9E9E9
| 524346 ||  || — || December 9, 2001 || Socorro || LINEAR ||  || align=right | 2.3 km || 
|-id=347 bgcolor=#d6d6d6
| 524347 ||  || — || December 9, 2001 || Socorro || LINEAR || Tj (2.97) || align=right | 4.0 km || 
|-id=348 bgcolor=#E9E9E9
| 524348 ||  || — || December 8, 2001 || Anderson Mesa || LONEOS ||  || align=right | 1.2 km || 
|-id=349 bgcolor=#d6d6d6
| 524349 ||  || — || October 17, 2001 || Socorro || LINEAR ||  || align=right | 3.6 km || 
|-id=350 bgcolor=#E9E9E9
| 524350 ||  || — || December 11, 2001 || Socorro || LINEAR ||  || align=right | 1.00 km || 
|-id=351 bgcolor=#d6d6d6
| 524351 ||  || — || December 10, 2001 || Socorro || LINEAR ||  || align=right | 3.4 km || 
|-id=352 bgcolor=#E9E9E9
| 524352 ||  || — || December 11, 2001 || Socorro || LINEAR ||  || align=right | 1.7 km || 
|-id=353 bgcolor=#d6d6d6
| 524353 ||  || — || October 23, 2001 || Anderson Mesa || LONEOS || Tj (2.95) || align=right | 3.9 km || 
|-id=354 bgcolor=#E9E9E9
| 524354 ||  || — || December 14, 2001 || Socorro || LINEAR ||  || align=right | 1.2 km || 
|-id=355 bgcolor=#fefefe
| 524355 ||  || — || August 21, 2001 || Kitt Peak || Spacewatch ||  || align=right data-sort-value="0.90" | 900 m || 
|-id=356 bgcolor=#d6d6d6
| 524356 ||  || — || November 19, 2001 || Socorro || LINEAR ||  || align=right | 4.0 km || 
|-id=357 bgcolor=#fefefe
| 524357 ||  || — || December 14, 2001 || Socorro || LINEAR ||  || align=right | 1.0 km || 
|-id=358 bgcolor=#d6d6d6
| 524358 ||  || — || November 20, 2001 || Socorro || LINEAR ||  || align=right | 2.5 km || 
|-id=359 bgcolor=#E9E9E9
| 524359 ||  || — || December 14, 2001 || Socorro || LINEAR ||  || align=right | 1.7 km || 
|-id=360 bgcolor=#fefefe
| 524360 ||  || — || December 14, 2001 || Socorro || LINEAR ||  || align=right data-sort-value="0.85" | 850 m || 
|-id=361 bgcolor=#fefefe
| 524361 ||  || — || December 14, 2001 || Socorro || LINEAR ||  || align=right data-sort-value="0.92" | 920 m || 
|-id=362 bgcolor=#E9E9E9
| 524362 ||  || — || December 14, 2001 || Socorro || LINEAR ||  || align=right | 1.2 km || 
|-id=363 bgcolor=#E9E9E9
| 524363 ||  || — || December 14, 2001 || Kitt Peak || Spacewatch ||  || align=right | 1.1 km || 
|-id=364 bgcolor=#fefefe
| 524364 ||  || — || November 16, 2001 || Kitt Peak || Spacewatch ||  || align=right data-sort-value="0.76" | 760 m || 
|-id=365 bgcolor=#C2E0FF
| 524365 ||  || — || December 10, 2001 || Mauna Kea || D. C. Jewitt, S. S. Sheppard, J. Kleyna || res2:5 || align=right | 117 km || 
|-id=366 bgcolor=#C2E0FF
| 524366 ||  || — || December 10, 2001 || Mauna Kea || D. C. Jewitt, S. S. Sheppard, J. Kleyna || cubewano (cold)moon || align=right | 300 km || 
|-id=367 bgcolor=#d6d6d6
| 524367 ||  || — || September 25, 2011 || Haleakala || Pan-STARRS ||  || align=right | 2.9 km || 
|-id=368 bgcolor=#E9E9E9
| 524368 ||  || — || December 14, 2001 || Kitt Peak || Spacewatch || JUN || align=right data-sort-value="0.89" | 890 m || 
|-id=369 bgcolor=#FA8072
| 524369 ||  || — || December 22, 2001 || Socorro || LINEAR ||  || align=right | 1.5 km || 
|-id=370 bgcolor=#E9E9E9
| 524370 ||  || — || December 17, 2001 || Socorro || LINEAR ||  || align=right | 1.3 km || 
|-id=371 bgcolor=#fefefe
| 524371 ||  || — || December 17, 2001 || Socorro || LINEAR ||  || align=right data-sort-value="0.82" | 820 m || 
|-id=372 bgcolor=#E9E9E9
| 524372 ||  || — || December 17, 2001 || Socorro || LINEAR ||  || align=right | 1.2 km || 
|-id=373 bgcolor=#d6d6d6
| 524373 ||  || — || December 9, 2001 || Socorro || LINEAR || Tj (2.96) || align=right | 3.2 km || 
|-id=374 bgcolor=#E9E9E9
| 524374 ||  || — || November 20, 2001 || Socorro || LINEAR ||  || align=right | 1.5 km || 
|-id=375 bgcolor=#E9E9E9
| 524375 ||  || — || December 18, 2001 || Socorro || LINEAR ||  || align=right | 2.5 km || 
|-id=376 bgcolor=#d6d6d6
| 524376 ||  || — || December 18, 2001 || Socorro || LINEAR ||  || align=right | 4.1 km || 
|-id=377 bgcolor=#fefefe
| 524377 ||  || — || December 18, 2001 || Socorro || LINEAR ||  || align=right data-sort-value="0.85" | 850 m || 
|-id=378 bgcolor=#d6d6d6
| 524378 ||  || — || December 18, 2001 || Socorro || LINEAR ||  || align=right | 3.2 km || 
|-id=379 bgcolor=#fefefe
| 524379 ||  || — || December 18, 2001 || Socorro || LINEAR ||  || align=right data-sort-value="0.58" | 580 m || 
|-id=380 bgcolor=#d6d6d6
| 524380 ||  || — || December 18, 2001 || Socorro || LINEAR ||  || align=right | 4.1 km || 
|-id=381 bgcolor=#E9E9E9
| 524381 ||  || — || December 18, 2001 || Socorro || LINEAR ||  || align=right | 2.1 km || 
|-id=382 bgcolor=#E9E9E9
| 524382 ||  || — || December 18, 2001 || Socorro || LINEAR ||  || align=right | 1.6 km || 
|-id=383 bgcolor=#d6d6d6
| 524383 ||  || — || December 17, 2001 || Kitt Peak || Spacewatch ||  || align=right | 4.6 km || 
|-id=384 bgcolor=#fefefe
| 524384 ||  || — || December 17, 2001 || Socorro || LINEAR ||  || align=right data-sort-value="0.83" | 830 m || 
|-id=385 bgcolor=#E9E9E9
| 524385 ||  || — || December 17, 2001 || Kitt Peak || Spacewatch ||  || align=right | 1.1 km || 
|-id=386 bgcolor=#E9E9E9
| 524386 ||  || — || December 9, 2001 || Socorro || LINEAR ||  || align=right | 1.7 km || 
|-id=387 bgcolor=#d6d6d6
| 524387 ||  || — || December 9, 2001 || Socorro || LINEAR ||  || align=right | 4.1 km || 
|-id=388 bgcolor=#d6d6d6
| 524388 ||  || — || December 17, 2001 || Kitt Peak || Spacewatch || Tj (2.97) || align=right | 3.5 km || 
|-id=389 bgcolor=#E9E9E9
| 524389 ||  || — || December 17, 2001 || Kitt Peak || Spacewatch ||  || align=right data-sort-value="0.76" | 760 m || 
|-id=390 bgcolor=#d6d6d6
| 524390 ||  || — || November 20, 2001 || Socorro || LINEAR || Tj (2.99) || align=right | 2.5 km || 
|-id=391 bgcolor=#FFC2E0
| 524391 ||  || — || January 7, 2002 || Haleakala || NEAT || AMO || align=right data-sort-value="0.26" | 260 m || 
|-id=392 bgcolor=#FFC2E0
| 524392 ||  || — || January 9, 2002 || Socorro || LINEAR || APO +1km || align=right data-sort-value="0.88" | 880 m || 
|-id=393 bgcolor=#E9E9E9
| 524393 ||  || — || January 6, 2002 || Socorro || LINEAR ||  || align=right | 2.2 km || 
|-id=394 bgcolor=#fefefe
| 524394 ||  || — || January 6, 2002 || Socorro || LINEAR || H || align=right data-sort-value="0.88" | 880 m || 
|-id=395 bgcolor=#FA8072
| 524395 ||  || — || January 12, 2002 || Socorro || LINEAR ||  || align=right | 1.5 km || 
|-id=396 bgcolor=#E9E9E9
| 524396 ||  || — || December 18, 2001 || Socorro || LINEAR ||  || align=right | 1.6 km || 
|-id=397 bgcolor=#d6d6d6
| 524397 ||  || — || January 6, 2002 || Kitt Peak || Spacewatch ||  || align=right | 3.0 km || 
|-id=398 bgcolor=#d6d6d6
| 524398 ||  || — || January 6, 2002 || Kitt Peak || Spacewatch ||  || align=right | 3.2 km || 
|-id=399 bgcolor=#d6d6d6
| 524399 ||  || — || January 9, 2002 || Socorro || LINEAR || Tj (2.98) || align=right | 3.9 km || 
|-id=400 bgcolor=#d6d6d6
| 524400 ||  || — || January 9, 2002 || Socorro || LINEAR ||  || align=right | 2.4 km || 
|}

524401–524500 

|-bgcolor=#d6d6d6
| 524401 ||  || — || December 23, 2001 || Kitt Peak || Spacewatch ||  || align=right | 2.9 km || 
|-id=402 bgcolor=#fefefe
| 524402 ||  || — || January 9, 2002 || Socorro || LINEAR ||  || align=right data-sort-value="0.92" | 920 m || 
|-id=403 bgcolor=#E9E9E9
| 524403 ||  || — || January 27, 1998 || Caussols || ODAS ||  || align=right | 1.6 km || 
|-id=404 bgcolor=#E9E9E9
| 524404 ||  || — || December 18, 2001 || Socorro || LINEAR ||  || align=right | 1.2 km || 
|-id=405 bgcolor=#E9E9E9
| 524405 ||  || — || January 13, 2002 || Socorro || LINEAR ||  || align=right | 1.3 km || 
|-id=406 bgcolor=#E9E9E9
| 524406 ||  || — || December 19, 2001 || Kitt Peak || Spacewatch ||  || align=right | 1.9 km || 
|-id=407 bgcolor=#d6d6d6
| 524407 ||  || — || January 14, 2002 || Socorro || LINEAR ||  || align=right | 4.1 km || 
|-id=408 bgcolor=#E9E9E9
| 524408 ||  || — || January 14, 2002 || Socorro || LINEAR ||  || align=right | 1.7 km || 
|-id=409 bgcolor=#d6d6d6
| 524409 ||  || — || December 17, 2001 || Socorro || LINEAR || Tj (2.99) || align=right | 4.1 km || 
|-id=410 bgcolor=#E9E9E9
| 524410 ||  || — || December 17, 2001 || Socorro || LINEAR ||  || align=right | 1.4 km || 
|-id=411 bgcolor=#fefefe
| 524411 ||  || — || December 14, 2001 || Kitt Peak || Spacewatch ||  || align=right data-sort-value="0.71" | 710 m || 
|-id=412 bgcolor=#E9E9E9
| 524412 ||  || — || December 17, 2001 || Socorro || LINEAR ||  || align=right | 1.0 km || 
|-id=413 bgcolor=#d6d6d6
| 524413 ||  || — || January 12, 2002 || Campo Imperatore || CINEOS ||  || align=right | 2.4 km || 
|-id=414 bgcolor=#d6d6d6
| 524414 ||  || — || January 12, 2002 || Kitt Peak || Spacewatch ||  || align=right | 2.8 km || 
|-id=415 bgcolor=#d6d6d6
| 524415 ||  || — || January 13, 2002 || Kitt Peak || Spacewatch ||  || align=right | 4.2 km || 
|-id=416 bgcolor=#fefefe
| 524416 ||  || — || January 12, 2002 || Kitt Peak || Spacewatch ||  || align=right data-sort-value="0.69" | 690 m || 
|-id=417 bgcolor=#E9E9E9
| 524417 ||  || — || December 14, 2001 || Kitt Peak || Spacewatch ||  || align=right | 2.9 km || 
|-id=418 bgcolor=#d6d6d6
| 524418 ||  || — || December 10, 2001 || Kitt Peak || Spacewatch || THB || align=right | 2.3 km || 
|-id=419 bgcolor=#E9E9E9
| 524419 ||  || — || January 8, 2002 || Kitt Peak || Spacewatch ||  || align=right | 1.5 km || 
|-id=420 bgcolor=#FA8072
| 524420 ||  || — || January 19, 2002 || Anderson Mesa || LONEOS ||  || align=right data-sort-value="0.68" | 680 m || 
|-id=421 bgcolor=#FA8072
| 524421 ||  || — || February 6, 2002 || Socorro || LINEAR ||  || align=right | 1.7 km || 
|-id=422 bgcolor=#E9E9E9
| 524422 ||  || — || February 7, 2002 || Kitt Peak || Spacewatch ||  || align=right | 1.1 km || 
|-id=423 bgcolor=#E9E9E9
| 524423 ||  || — || February 7, 2002 || Socorro || LINEAR ||  || align=right | 1.6 km || 
|-id=424 bgcolor=#d6d6d6
| 524424 ||  || — || February 7, 2002 || Socorro || LINEAR ||  || align=right | 3.0 km || 
|-id=425 bgcolor=#d6d6d6
| 524425 ||  || — || February 9, 2002 || Kitt Peak || Spacewatch ||  || align=right | 3.9 km || 
|-id=426 bgcolor=#d6d6d6
| 524426 ||  || — || February 8, 2002 || Socorro || LINEAR ||  || align=right | 3.2 km || 
|-id=427 bgcolor=#E9E9E9
| 524427 ||  || — || February 10, 2002 || Socorro || LINEAR ||  || align=right | 1.6 km || 
|-id=428 bgcolor=#fefefe
| 524428 ||  || — || February 10, 2002 || Socorro || LINEAR ||  || align=right data-sort-value="0.89" | 890 m || 
|-id=429 bgcolor=#E9E9E9
| 524429 ||  || — || February 7, 2002 || Kitt Peak || Spacewatch ||  || align=right | 1.2 km || 
|-id=430 bgcolor=#E9E9E9
| 524430 ||  || — || February 8, 2002 || Socorro || LINEAR ||  || align=right | 2.1 km || 
|-id=431 bgcolor=#E9E9E9
| 524431 ||  || — || February 9, 2002 || Kitt Peak || Spacewatch ||  || align=right | 1.6 km || 
|-id=432 bgcolor=#fefefe
| 524432 ||  || — || February 10, 2002 || Socorro || LINEAR ||  || align=right data-sort-value="0.68" | 680 m || 
|-id=433 bgcolor=#E9E9E9
| 524433 ||  || — || February 10, 2002 || Socorro || LINEAR ||  || align=right data-sort-value="0.98" | 980 m || 
|-id=434 bgcolor=#d6d6d6
| 524434 ||  || — || February 9, 2002 || Kitt Peak || Spacewatch || Tj (2.99) || align=right | 3.7 km || 
|-id=435 bgcolor=#C2E0FF
| 524435 ||  || — || February 6, 2002 || Kitt Peak || M. W. Buie || cubewano (hot)critical || align=right | 363 km || 
|-id=436 bgcolor=#E9E9E9
| 524436 ||  || — || February 6, 2002 || Kitt Peak || Spacewatch ||  || align=right | 1.2 km || 
|-id=437 bgcolor=#E9E9E9
| 524437 ||  || — || February 6, 2002 || Kitt Peak || Spacewatch ||  || align=right data-sort-value="0.95" | 950 m || 
|-id=438 bgcolor=#E9E9E9
| 524438 ||  || — || February 7, 2002 || Kitt Peak || Spacewatch ||  || align=right | 1.3 km || 
|-id=439 bgcolor=#d6d6d6
| 524439 ||  || — || February 9, 2002 || Kitt Peak || Spacewatch ||  || align=right | 3.3 km || 
|-id=440 bgcolor=#fefefe
| 524440 ||  || — || February 7, 2002 || Kitt Peak || Spacewatch ||  || align=right data-sort-value="0.63" | 630 m || 
|-id=441 bgcolor=#E9E9E9
| 524441 ||  || — || February 7, 2002 || Kitt Peak || Spacewatch ||  || align=right | 1.2 km || 
|-id=442 bgcolor=#E9E9E9
| 524442 ||  || — || February 10, 2002 || Kitt Peak || Spacewatch ||  || align=right | 1.5 km || 
|-id=443 bgcolor=#FA8072
| 524443 ||  || — || February 22, 2002 || Socorro || LINEAR ||  || align=right | 1.5 km || 
|-id=444 bgcolor=#E9E9E9
| 524444 ||  || — || February 16, 2002 || Palomar || NEAT ||  || align=right | 1.8 km || 
|-id=445 bgcolor=#d6d6d6
| 524445 ||  || — || March 13, 2002 || Palomar || NEAT || Tj (2.96) || align=right | 3.9 km || 
|-id=446 bgcolor=#d6d6d6
| 524446 ||  || — || March 12, 2002 || Palomar || NEAT ||  || align=right | 3.0 km || 
|-id=447 bgcolor=#E9E9E9
| 524447 ||  || — || March 5, 2002 || Kitt Peak || Spacewatch ||  || align=right data-sort-value="0.89" | 890 m || 
|-id=448 bgcolor=#fefefe
| 524448 ||  || — || March 9, 2002 || Kitt Peak || Spacewatch ||  || align=right data-sort-value="0.57" | 570 m || 
|-id=449 bgcolor=#E9E9E9
| 524449 ||  || — || March 12, 2002 || Kitt Peak || Spacewatch ||  || align=right | 2.1 km || 
|-id=450 bgcolor=#fefefe
| 524450 ||  || — || March 7, 2002 || Cima Ekar || ADAS ||  || align=right data-sort-value="0.75" | 750 m || 
|-id=451 bgcolor=#d6d6d6
| 524451 ||  || — || March 12, 2002 || Palomar || NEAT ||  || align=right | 2.6 km || 
|-id=452 bgcolor=#E9E9E9
| 524452 ||  || — || March 13, 2002 || Palomar || NEAT ||  || align=right | 1.4 km || 
|-id=453 bgcolor=#E9E9E9
| 524453 ||  || — || March 9, 2002 || Kitt Peak || Spacewatch ||  || align=right data-sort-value="0.64" | 640 m || 
|-id=454 bgcolor=#E9E9E9
| 524454 ||  || — || March 10, 2002 || Anderson Mesa || LONEOS ||  || align=right | 1.5 km || 
|-id=455 bgcolor=#E9E9E9
| 524455 ||  || — || March 12, 2002 || Palomar || NEAT ||  || align=right | 1.3 km || 
|-id=456 bgcolor=#fefefe
| 524456 ||  || — || March 13, 2002 || Kitt Peak || Spacewatch ||  || align=right data-sort-value="0.74" | 740 m || 
|-id=457 bgcolor=#C2E0FF
| 524457 ||  || — || March 20, 2002 || Mauna Kea || B. Gladman, J. J. Kavelaars, A. Doressoundiram || res3:4 || align=right | 140 km || 
|-id=458 bgcolor=#E9E9E9
| 524458 ||  || — || March 18, 2002 || Kitt Peak || M. W. Buie ||  || align=right data-sort-value="0.65" | 650 m || 
|-id=459 bgcolor=#FFC2E0
| 524459 ||  || — || April 1, 2002 || Socorro || LINEAR || APOcritical || align=right data-sort-value="0.31" | 310 m || 
|-id=460 bgcolor=#C2E0FF
| 524460 ||  || — || April 8, 2002 || Cerro Tololo || M. W. Buie || plutino || align=right | 222 km || 
|-id=461 bgcolor=#fefefe
| 524461 ||  || — || March 24, 2002 || Kitt Peak || Spacewatch ||  || align=right data-sort-value="0.75" | 750 m || 
|-id=462 bgcolor=#fefefe
| 524462 ||  || — || April 10, 2002 || Socorro || LINEAR ||  || align=right data-sort-value="0.69" | 690 m || 
|-id=463 bgcolor=#E9E9E9
| 524463 ||  || — || April 8, 2002 || Palomar || NEAT ||  || align=right | 2.5 km || 
|-id=464 bgcolor=#E9E9E9
| 524464 ||  || — || March 20, 2002 || Kitt Peak || Spacewatch ||  || align=right | 2.2 km || 
|-id=465 bgcolor=#E9E9E9
| 524465 ||  || — || April 5, 2002 || Anderson Mesa || LONEOS ||  || align=right | 1.4 km || 
|-id=466 bgcolor=#E9E9E9
| 524466 ||  || — || April 10, 2002 || Socorro || LINEAR ||  || align=right | 3.4 km || 
|-id=467 bgcolor=#E9E9E9
| 524467 ||  || — || April 13, 2002 || Palomar || NEAT ||  || align=right | 1.3 km || 
|-id=468 bgcolor=#d6d6d6
| 524468 ||  || — || April 9, 2002 || Palomar || NEAT ||  || align=right | 2.8 km || 
|-id=469 bgcolor=#d6d6d6
| 524469 ||  || — || March 15, 2002 || Kitt Peak || Spacewatch || THB || align=right | 3.0 km || 
|-id=470 bgcolor=#d6d6d6
| 524470 ||  || — || April 22, 2002 || Socorro || LINEAR || Tj (2.97) || align=right | 3.6 km || 
|-id=471 bgcolor=#FFC2E0
| 524471 ||  || — || May 8, 2002 || Socorro || LINEAR || ATE || align=right data-sort-value="0.30" | 300 m || 
|-id=472 bgcolor=#fefefe
| 524472 ||  || — || May 11, 2002 || Socorro || LINEAR ||  || align=right data-sort-value="0.69" | 690 m || 
|-id=473 bgcolor=#fefefe
| 524473 ||  || — || April 10, 2002 || Socorro || LINEAR ||  || align=right data-sort-value="0.71" | 710 m || 
|-id=474 bgcolor=#FFC2E0
| 524474 ||  || — || May 18, 2002 || Palomar || NEAT || AMO || align=right data-sort-value="0.51" | 510 m || 
|-id=475 bgcolor=#FFC2E0
| 524475 ||  || — || May 22, 2002 || Socorro || LINEAR || APOPHAcritical || align=right data-sort-value="0.47" | 470 m || 
|-id=476 bgcolor=#fefefe
| 524476 ||  || — || May 8, 2002 || Anderson Mesa || LONEOS ||  || align=right data-sort-value="0.83" | 830 m || 
|-id=477 bgcolor=#FA8072
| 524477 ||  || — || June 7, 2002 || Socorro || LINEAR ||  || align=right data-sort-value="0.70" | 700 m || 
|-id=478 bgcolor=#E9E9E9
| 524478 ||  || — || June 3, 2002 || Palomar || NEAT ||  || align=right | 1.1 km || 
|-id=479 bgcolor=#fefefe
| 524479 ||  || — || July 9, 2002 || Palomar || NEAT ||  || align=right data-sort-value="0.77" | 770 m || 
|-id=480 bgcolor=#fefefe
| 524480 ||  || — || July 18, 2002 || Palomar || NEAT ||  || align=right data-sort-value="0.67" | 670 m || 
|-id=481 bgcolor=#FA8072
| 524481 ||  || — || August 6, 2002 || Palomar || NEAT ||  || align=right | 2.7 km || 
|-id=482 bgcolor=#E9E9E9
| 524482 ||  || — || August 11, 2002 || Palomar || NEAT ||  || align=right | 1.3 km || 
|-id=483 bgcolor=#fefefe
| 524483 ||  || — || August 11, 2002 || Palomar || NEAT ||  || align=right data-sort-value="0.71" | 710 m || 
|-id=484 bgcolor=#fefefe
| 524484 ||  || — || September 20, 1995 || Kitt Peak || Spacewatch ||  || align=right data-sort-value="0.68" | 680 m || 
|-id=485 bgcolor=#fefefe
| 524485 ||  || — || August 15, 2002 || Palomar || NEAT ||  || align=right data-sort-value="0.66" | 660 m || 
|-id=486 bgcolor=#E9E9E9
| 524486 ||  || — || February 2, 2000 || Kitt Peak || Spacewatch ||  || align=right | 2.7 km || 
|-id=487 bgcolor=#fefefe
| 524487 ||  || — || August 16, 2002 || Palomar || NEAT ||  || align=right data-sort-value="0.60" | 600 m || 
|-id=488 bgcolor=#fefefe
| 524488 ||  || — || August 30, 2002 || Palomar || NEAT ||  || align=right data-sort-value="0.72" | 720 m || 
|-id=489 bgcolor=#d6d6d6
| 524489 ||  || — || August 18, 2002 || Palomar || NEAT || Tj (2.95) || align=right | 2.9 km || 
|-id=490 bgcolor=#d6d6d6
| 524490 ||  || — || August 31, 2002 || Palomar || NEAT || Tj (2.94) || align=right | 4.6 km || 
|-id=491 bgcolor=#d6d6d6
| 524491 ||  || — || August 30, 2002 || Palomar || NEAT || 3:2 || align=right | 5.2 km || 
|-id=492 bgcolor=#fefefe
| 524492 ||  || — || March 2, 2001 || Anderson Mesa || LONEOS ||  || align=right data-sort-value="0.95" | 950 m || 
|-id=493 bgcolor=#d6d6d6
| 524493 ||  || — || September 2, 2002 || Ondřejov || P. Kušnirák, P. Pravec || SHU3:2 || align=right | 5.3 km || 
|-id=494 bgcolor=#d6d6d6
| 524494 ||  || — || September 4, 2002 || Anderson Mesa || LONEOS ||  || align=right | 1.6 km || 
|-id=495 bgcolor=#E9E9E9
| 524495 ||  || — || September 4, 2002 || Anderson Mesa || LONEOS ||  || align=right | 1.6 km || 
|-id=496 bgcolor=#d6d6d6
| 524496 ||  || — || September 5, 2002 || Socorro || LINEAR ||  || align=right | 1.9 km || 
|-id=497 bgcolor=#d6d6d6
| 524497 ||  || — || August 29, 2002 || Kitt Peak || Spacewatch ||  || align=right | 2.2 km || 
|-id=498 bgcolor=#FFC2E0
| 524498 ||  || — || September 6, 2002 || Socorro || LINEAR || AMO +1kmcritical || align=right data-sort-value="0.85" | 850 m || 
|-id=499 bgcolor=#d6d6d6
| 524499 ||  || — || September 12, 2002 || Palomar || NEAT || 3:2 || align=right | 4.0 km || 
|-id=500 bgcolor=#d6d6d6
| 524500 ||  || — || September 14, 2002 || Kitt Peak || Spacewatch ||  || align=right | 1.7 km || 
|}

524501–524600 

|-bgcolor=#fefefe
| 524501 ||  || — || September 6, 2002 || Socorro || LINEAR ||  || align=right data-sort-value="0.83" | 830 m || 
|-id=502 bgcolor=#d6d6d6
| 524502 ||  || — || September 14, 2002 || Palomar || NEAT || 3:2 || align=right | 3.5 km || 
|-id=503 bgcolor=#d6d6d6
| 524503 ||  || — || September 4, 2002 || Palomar || NEAT ||  || align=right | 2.0 km || 
|-id=504 bgcolor=#fefefe
| 524504 ||  || — || September 5, 2002 || Socorro || LINEAR ||  || align=right data-sort-value="0.69" | 690 m || 
|-id=505 bgcolor=#d6d6d6
| 524505 ||  || — || September 30, 2002 || Socorro || LINEAR || AEG || align=right | 2.6 km || 
|-id=506 bgcolor=#d6d6d6
| 524506 ||  || — || September 16, 2002 || Palomar || NEAT ||  || align=right | 2.7 km || 
|-id=507 bgcolor=#fefefe
| 524507 ||  || — || October 3, 2002 || Socorro || LINEAR ||  || align=right data-sort-value="0.88" | 880 m || 
|-id=508 bgcolor=#d6d6d6
| 524508 ||  || — || October 10, 2002 || Anderson Mesa || LONEOS || Tj (2.91) || align=right | 1.9 km || 
|-id=509 bgcolor=#fefefe
| 524509 ||  || — || October 3, 2002 || Campo Imperatore || CINEOS || H || align=right data-sort-value="0.67" | 670 m || 
|-id=510 bgcolor=#fefefe
| 524510 ||  || — || October 9, 2002 || Kitt Peak || Spacewatch ||  || align=right data-sort-value="0.67" | 670 m || 
|-id=511 bgcolor=#fefefe
| 524511 ||  || — || October 10, 2002 || Kitt Peak || Spacewatch || H || align=right data-sort-value="0.62" | 620 m || 
|-id=512 bgcolor=#d6d6d6
| 524512 ||  || — || September 13, 2007 || Kitt Peak || Spacewatch ||  || align=right | 1.9 km || 
|-id=513 bgcolor=#fefefe
| 524513 ||  || — || October 9, 2002 || Palomar || NEAT ||  || align=right | 1.0 km || 
|-id=514 bgcolor=#d6d6d6
| 524514 ||  || — || October 6, 2002 || Palomar || NEAT ||  || align=right | 1.9 km || 
|-id=515 bgcolor=#d6d6d6
| 524515 ||  || — || September 13, 2007 || Mount Lemmon || Mount Lemmon Survey ||  || align=right | 2.6 km || 
|-id=516 bgcolor=#FFC2E0
| 524516 ||  || — || October 22, 2002 || Palomar || NEAT || AMO +1km || align=right | 1.4 km || 
|-id=517 bgcolor=#d6d6d6
| 524517 ||  || — || October 29, 2002 || Kitt Peak || Spacewatch ||  || align=right | 3.3 km || 
|-id=518 bgcolor=#d6d6d6
| 524518 ||  || — || October 30, 2002 || Kitt Peak || Spacewatch ||  || align=right | 3.0 km || 
|-id=519 bgcolor=#E9E9E9
| 524519 ||  || — || October 30, 2002 || Kitt Peak || Spacewatch ||  || align=right data-sort-value="0.92" | 920 m || 
|-id=520 bgcolor=#d6d6d6
| 524520 ||  || — || October 31, 2002 || Kitt Peak || Spacewatch ||  || align=right | 2.0 km || 
|-id=521 bgcolor=#fefefe
| 524521 ||  || — || September 2, 1994 || Kitt Peak || Spacewatch ||  || align=right data-sort-value="0.90" | 900 m || 
|-id=522 bgcolor=#FFC2E0
| 524522 ||  || — || November 11, 2002 || Anderson Mesa || LONEOS || ATEPHA || align=right data-sort-value="0.28" | 280 m || 
|-id=523 bgcolor=#fefefe
| 524523 ||  || — || November 6, 2002 || Socorro || LINEAR ||  || align=right data-sort-value="0.91" | 910 m || 
|-id=524 bgcolor=#d6d6d6
| 524524 ||  || — || November 12, 2002 || Socorro || LINEAR ||  || align=right | 3.3 km || 
|-id=525 bgcolor=#d6d6d6
| 524525 ||  || — || November 5, 2002 || Palomar || NEAT ||  || align=right | 2.0 km || 
|-id=526 bgcolor=#d6d6d6
| 524526 ||  || — || December 5, 2002 || Socorro || LINEAR ||  || align=right | 3.7 km || 
|-id=527 bgcolor=#fefefe
| 524527 ||  || — || October 11, 1998 || Anderson Mesa || LONEOS ||  || align=right | 1.0 km || 
|-id=528 bgcolor=#d6d6d6
| 524528 ||  || — || November 14, 1996 || Kitt Peak || Spacewatch ||  || align=right | 3.2 km || 
|-id=529 bgcolor=#E9E9E9
| 524529 ||  || — || December 11, 2002 || Socorro || LINEAR ||  || align=right | 1.6 km || 
|-id=530 bgcolor=#FFC2E0
| 524530 ||  || — || December 13, 2002 || Kitt Peak || Spacewatch || APO || align=right data-sort-value="0.40" | 400 m || 
|-id=531 bgcolor=#C2E0FF
| 524531 ||  || — || December 4, 2002 || Kitt Peak || M. W. Buie || cubewano (cold)mooncritical || align=right | 327 km || 
|-id=532 bgcolor=#fefefe
| 524532 ||  || — || December 5, 2002 || Socorro || LINEAR ||  || align=right data-sort-value="0.94" | 940 m || 
|-id=533 bgcolor=#E9E9E9
| 524533 ||  || — || December 31, 2002 || Socorro || LINEAR ||  || align=right | 1.3 km || 
|-id=534 bgcolor=#d6d6d6
| 524534 ||  || — || December 5, 2002 || Socorro || LINEAR ||  || align=right | 3.1 km || 
|-id=535 bgcolor=#d6d6d6
| 524535 ||  || — || January 1, 2003 || Kitt Peak || Spacewatch ||  || align=right | 3.5 km || 
|-id=536 bgcolor=#FFC2E0
| 524536 ||  || — || January 5, 2003 || Anderson Mesa || LONEOS || AMO || align=right data-sort-value="0.62" | 620 m || 
|-id=537 bgcolor=#d6d6d6
| 524537 ||  || — || January 1, 2003 || Socorro || LINEAR ||  || align=right | 3.6 km || 
|-id=538 bgcolor=#E9E9E9
| 524538 ||  || — || December 31, 2002 || Socorro || LINEAR ||  || align=right | 1.0 km || 
|-id=539 bgcolor=#E9E9E9
| 524539 ||  || — || January 4, 2003 || Socorro || LINEAR ||  || align=right | 1.6 km || 
|-id=540 bgcolor=#E9E9E9
| 524540 ||  || — || January 5, 2003 || Socorro || LINEAR ||  || align=right | 1.1 km || 
|-id=541 bgcolor=#E9E9E9
| 524541 ||  || — || January 7, 2003 || Socorro || LINEAR ||  || align=right | 1.1 km || 
|-id=542 bgcolor=#d6d6d6
| 524542 ||  || — || January 11, 2003 || Socorro || LINEAR ||  || align=right | 1.8 km || 
|-id=543 bgcolor=#E9E9E9
| 524543 ||  || — || January 13, 2003 || Socorro || LINEAR ||  || align=right | 1.5 km || 
|-id=544 bgcolor=#d6d6d6
| 524544 ||  || — || January 26, 2003 || Anderson Mesa || LONEOS ||  || align=right | 3.3 km || 
|-id=545 bgcolor=#fefefe
| 524545 ||  || — || January 4, 2003 || Socorro || LINEAR ||  || align=right data-sort-value="0.98" | 980 m || 
|-id=546 bgcolor=#d6d6d6
| 524546 ||  || — || January 9, 2003 || Socorro || LINEAR || Tj (2.99) || align=right | 4.0 km || 
|-id=547 bgcolor=#E9E9E9
| 524547 ||  || — || January 29, 2003 || Palomar || NEAT ||  || align=right | 1.4 km || 
|-id=548 bgcolor=#E9E9E9
| 524548 ||  || — || February 26, 2003 || Socorro || LINEAR ||  || align=right | 1.7 km || 
|-id=549 bgcolor=#fefefe
| 524549 ||  || — || January 27, 2003 || Socorro || LINEAR || H || align=right data-sort-value="0.56" | 560 m || 
|-id=550 bgcolor=#E9E9E9
| 524550 ||  || — || March 8, 2003 || Socorro || LINEAR ||  || align=right | 1.9 km || 
|-id=551 bgcolor=#fefefe
| 524551 ||  || — || March 7, 2003 || Anderson Mesa || LONEOS || H || align=right data-sort-value="0.66" | 660 m || 
|-id=552 bgcolor=#fefefe
| 524552 ||  || — || March 10, 2003 || Kitt Peak || Spacewatch ||  || align=right data-sort-value="0.84" | 840 m || 
|-id=553 bgcolor=#fefefe
| 524553 ||  || — || March 9, 2003 || Socorro || LINEAR || H || align=right data-sort-value="0.70" | 700 m || 
|-id=554 bgcolor=#E9E9E9
| 524554 ||  || — || March 11, 2003 || Kitt Peak || Spacewatch ||  || align=right | 1.0 km || 
|-id=555 bgcolor=#d6d6d6
| 524555 ||  || — || March 23, 2003 || Kitt Peak || Spacewatch ||  || align=right | 3.7 km || 
|-id=556 bgcolor=#d6d6d6
| 524556 ||  || — || March 23, 2003 || Kitt Peak || Spacewatch ||  || align=right | 2.9 km || 
|-id=557 bgcolor=#d6d6d6
| 524557 ||  || — || March 24, 2003 || Kitt Peak || Spacewatch ||  || align=right | 2.2 km || 
|-id=558 bgcolor=#E9E9E9
| 524558 ||  || — || March 27, 2003 || Anderson Mesa || LONEOS ||  || align=right | 2.4 km || 
|-id=559 bgcolor=#d6d6d6
| 524559 ||  || — || March 29, 2003 || Anderson Mesa || LONEOS ||  || align=right | 3.0 km || 
|-id=560 bgcolor=#E9E9E9
| 524560 ||  || — || March 30, 2003 || Kitt Peak || Spacewatch ||  || align=right | 1.1 km || 
|-id=561 bgcolor=#d6d6d6
| 524561 ||  || — || March 30, 2003 || Kitt Peak || Spacewatch ||  || align=right | 2.0 km || 
|-id=562 bgcolor=#E9E9E9
| 524562 ||  || — || March 24, 2003 || Kitt Peak || Spacewatch ||  || align=right | 1.6 km || 
|-id=563 bgcolor=#E9E9E9
| 524563 ||  || — || March 31, 2003 || Kitt Peak || Spacewatch ||  || align=right | 1.4 km || 
|-id=564 bgcolor=#E9E9E9
| 524564 ||  || — || March 31, 2003 || Kitt Peak || Spacewatch ||  || align=right | 1.5 km || 
|-id=565 bgcolor=#E9E9E9
| 524565 ||  || — || March 23, 2003 || Kitt Peak || Spacewatch ||  || align=right | 1.1 km || 
|-id=566 bgcolor=#E9E9E9
| 524566 ||  || — || April 4, 2003 || Kitt Peak || Spacewatch ||  || align=right | 1.3 km || 
|-id=567 bgcolor=#d6d6d6
| 524567 ||  || — || April 4, 2003 || Kitt Peak || Spacewatch ||  || align=right | 2.3 km || 
|-id=568 bgcolor=#E9E9E9
| 524568 ||  || — || April 5, 2003 || Kitt Peak || Spacewatch ||  || align=right | 1.2 km || 
|-id=569 bgcolor=#E9E9E9
| 524569 ||  || — || April 5, 2003 || Kitt Peak || Spacewatch ||  || align=right | 1.3 km || 
|-id=570 bgcolor=#d6d6d6
| 524570 ||  || — || April 7, 2003 || Kitt Peak || Spacewatch ||  || align=right | 2.6 km || 
|-id=571 bgcolor=#E9E9E9
| 524571 ||  || — || October 1, 2000 || Anderson Mesa || LONEOS ||  || align=right | 1.7 km || 
|-id=572 bgcolor=#d6d6d6
| 524572 ||  || — || April 7, 2003 || Kitt Peak || Spacewatch ||  || align=right | 2.7 km || 
|-id=573 bgcolor=#fefefe
| 524573 ||  || — || April 10, 2003 || Kitt Peak || Spacewatch || H || align=right data-sort-value="0.73" | 730 m || 
|-id=574 bgcolor=#d6d6d6
| 524574 ||  || — || April 24, 2003 || Kitt Peak || Spacewatch ||  || align=right | 3.3 km || 
|-id=575 bgcolor=#d6d6d6
| 524575 ||  || — || April 26, 2003 || Kitt Peak || Spacewatch ||  || align=right | 3.0 km || 
|-id=576 bgcolor=#E9E9E9
| 524576 ||  || — || April 26, 2003 || Kitt Peak || Spacewatch ||  || align=right | 1.4 km || 
|-id=577 bgcolor=#d6d6d6
| 524577 ||  || — || March 26, 2003 || Kitt Peak || Spacewatch ||  || align=right | 2.1 km || 
|-id=578 bgcolor=#E9E9E9
| 524578 ||  || — || April 25, 2003 || Kitt Peak || Spacewatch ||  || align=right | 1.1 km || 
|-id=579 bgcolor=#E9E9E9
| 524579 ||  || — || April 30, 2003 || Kitt Peak || Spacewatch ||  || align=right | 1.4 km || 
|-id=580 bgcolor=#E9E9E9
| 524580 ||  || — || April 25, 2003 || Kitt Peak || Spacewatch ||  || align=right | 1.8 km || 
|-id=581 bgcolor=#fefefe
| 524581 ||  || — || May 1, 2003 || Kitt Peak || Spacewatch ||  || align=right data-sort-value="0.54" | 540 m || 
|-id=582 bgcolor=#d6d6d6
| 524582 ||  || — || May 1, 2003 || Kitt Peak || Spacewatch ||  || align=right | 2.0 km || 
|-id=583 bgcolor=#E9E9E9
| 524583 ||  || — || March 27, 2003 || Kitt Peak || Spacewatch ||  || align=right data-sort-value="0.68" | 680 m || 
|-id=584 bgcolor=#E9E9E9
| 524584 ||  || — || May 2, 2003 || Kitt Peak || Spacewatch ||  || align=right | 1.3 km || 
|-id=585 bgcolor=#d6d6d6
| 524585 ||  || — || May 22, 2003 || Mount Graham || VATT ||  || align=right | 1.9 km || 
|-id=586 bgcolor=#E9E9E9
| 524586 ||  || — || May 25, 2003 || Kitt Peak || Spacewatch ||  || align=right | 1.6 km || 
|-id=587 bgcolor=#E9E9E9
| 524587 ||  || — || May 27, 2003 || Kitt Peak || Spacewatch ||  || align=right | 1.3 km || 
|-id=588 bgcolor=#d6d6d6
| 524588 ||  || — || May 27, 2003 || Kitt Peak || Spacewatch ||  || align=right | 2.3 km || 
|-id=589 bgcolor=#d6d6d6
| 524589 ||  || — || April 24, 2003 || Socorro || LINEAR || Tj (2.91) || align=right | 2.9 km || 
|-id=590 bgcolor=#E9E9E9
| 524590 ||  || — || April 5, 2003 || Kitt Peak || Spacewatch ||  || align=right data-sort-value="0.83" | 830 m || 
|-id=591 bgcolor=#d6d6d6
| 524591 ||  || — || April 30, 2003 || Kitt Peak || Spacewatch ||  || align=right | 3.3 km || 
|-id=592 bgcolor=#d6d6d6
| 524592 ||  || — || May 28, 2003 || Kitt Peak || Spacewatch ||  || align=right | 2.7 km || 
|-id=593 bgcolor=#FA8072
| 524593 ||  || — || July 2, 2003 || Haleakala || NEAT ||  || align=right data-sort-value="0.62" | 620 m || 
|-id=594 bgcolor=#FFC2E0
| 524594 ||  || — || July 3, 2003 || Socorro || LINEAR || APOPHA || align=right data-sort-value="0.65" | 650 m || 
|-id=595 bgcolor=#d6d6d6
| 524595 ||  || — || July 1, 2003 || Socorro || LINEAR ||  || align=right | 2.6 km || 
|-id=596 bgcolor=#E9E9E9
| 524596 ||  || — || July 3, 2003 || Kitt Peak || Spacewatch ||  || align=right | 2.4 km || 
|-id=597 bgcolor=#FFC2E0
| 524597 ||  || — || July 25, 2003 || Socorro || LINEAR || AMO || align=right data-sort-value="0.31" | 310 m || 
|-id=598 bgcolor=#FA8072
| 524598 ||  || — || August 1, 2003 || Socorro || LINEAR ||  || align=right data-sort-value="0.75" | 750 m || 
|-id=599 bgcolor=#FFC2E0
| 524599 ||  || — || August 5, 2003 || Socorro || LINEAR || AMO +1km || align=right | 1.3 km || 
|-id=600 bgcolor=#fefefe
| 524600 ||  || — || August 5, 2003 || Socorro || LINEAR ||  || align=right data-sort-value="0.75" | 750 m || 
|}

524601–524700 

|-bgcolor=#E9E9E9
| 524601 ||  || — || August 4, 2003 || Kitt Peak || Spacewatch ||  || align=right | 1.9 km || 
|-id=602 bgcolor=#fefefe
| 524602 ||  || — || August 20, 2003 || Campo Imperatore || CINEOS ||  || align=right data-sort-value="0.68" | 680 m || 
|-id=603 bgcolor=#FFC2E0
| 524603 ||  || — || August 25, 2003 || Socorro || LINEAR || APO || align=right data-sort-value="0.47" | 470 m || 
|-id=604 bgcolor=#FA8072
| 524604 ||  || — || August 5, 2003 || Socorro || LINEAR ||  || align=right data-sort-value="0.70" | 700 m || 
|-id=605 bgcolor=#fefefe
| 524605 ||  || — || August 21, 2003 || Campo Imperatore || CINEOS ||  || align=right data-sort-value="0.70" | 700 m || 
|-id=606 bgcolor=#FA8072
| 524606 ||  || — || August 28, 2003 || Palomar || NEAT ||  || align=right data-sort-value="0.75" | 750 m || 
|-id=607 bgcolor=#FA8072
| 524607 Davecarter ||  ||  || August 26, 2003 || Cerro Tololo || M. W. Buie ||  || align=right data-sort-value="0.53" | 530 m || 
|-id=608 bgcolor=#fefefe
| 524608 ||  || — || August 27, 2003 || Piszkéstető || K. Sárneczky, B. Sipőcz ||  || align=right data-sort-value="0.55" | 550 m || 
|-id=609 bgcolor=#fefefe
| 524609 ||  || — || August 31, 2003 || Kitt Peak || Spacewatch ||  || align=right data-sort-value="0.56" | 560 m || 
|-id=610 bgcolor=#E9E9E9
| 524610 ||  || — || August 31, 2003 || Kitt Peak || Spacewatch ||  || align=right | 2.4 km || 
|-id=611 bgcolor=#E9E9E9
| 524611 ||  || — || August 31, 2003 || Kitt Peak || Spacewatch ||  || align=right | 1.1 km || 
|-id=612 bgcolor=#C2E0FF
| 524612 ||  || — || August 26, 2003 || Cerro Tololo || M. W. Buie || cubewano? || align=right | 243 km || 
|-id=613 bgcolor=#C2E0FF
| 524613 ||  || — || August 31, 2003 || Mauna Kea || Mauna Kea Obs. || centaur || align=right | 154 km || 
|-id=614 bgcolor=#fefefe
| 524614 ||  || — || August 23, 2003 || Socorro || LINEAR ||  || align=right data-sort-value="0.86" | 860 m || 
|-id=615 bgcolor=#fefefe
| 524615 ||  || — || September 2, 2003 || Socorro || LINEAR ||  || align=right data-sort-value="0.98" | 980 m || 
|-id=616 bgcolor=#fefefe
| 524616 ||  || — || September 2, 2003 || Socorro || LINEAR ||  || align=right data-sort-value="0.98" | 980 m || 
|-id=617 bgcolor=#E9E9E9
| 524617 ||  || — || September 15, 2003 || Anderson Mesa || LONEOS ||  || align=right | 1.7 km || 
|-id=618 bgcolor=#E9E9E9
| 524618 ||  || — || September 15, 2003 || Anderson Mesa || LONEOS ||  || align=right data-sort-value="0.86" | 860 m || 
|-id=619 bgcolor=#fefefe
| 524619 ||  || — || September 16, 2003 || Kitt Peak || Spacewatch ||  || align=right data-sort-value="0.56" | 560 m || 
|-id=620 bgcolor=#E9E9E9
| 524620 ||  || — || September 16, 2003 || Kitt Peak || Spacewatch ||  || align=right | 1.9 km || 
|-id=621 bgcolor=#fefefe
| 524621 ||  || — || September 16, 2003 || Kitt Peak || Spacewatch ||  || align=right data-sort-value="0.59" | 590 m || 
|-id=622 bgcolor=#fefefe
| 524622 ||  || — || September 16, 2003 || Kitt Peak || Spacewatch ||  || align=right data-sort-value="0.59" | 590 m || 
|-id=623 bgcolor=#d6d6d6
| 524623 ||  || — || September 17, 2003 || Kitt Peak || Spacewatch || KOR || align=right | 1.1 km || 
|-id=624 bgcolor=#E9E9E9
| 524624 ||  || — || September 16, 2003 || Kitt Peak || Spacewatch ||  || align=right | 2.1 km || 
|-id=625 bgcolor=#fefefe
| 524625 ||  || — || September 3, 2003 || Socorro || LINEAR ||  || align=right data-sort-value="0.75" | 750 m || 
|-id=626 bgcolor=#fefefe
| 524626 ||  || — || September 17, 2003 || Kitt Peak || Spacewatch ||  || align=right data-sort-value="0.62" | 620 m || 
|-id=627 bgcolor=#d6d6d6
| 524627 ||  || — || September 17, 2003 || Kitt Peak || Spacewatch ||  || align=right | 2.0 km || 
|-id=628 bgcolor=#E9E9E9
| 524628 ||  || — || September 18, 2003 || Kitt Peak || Spacewatch ||  || align=right | 1.6 km || 
|-id=629 bgcolor=#fefefe
| 524629 ||  || — || September 18, 2003 || Kitt Peak || Spacewatch ||  || align=right data-sort-value="0.77" | 770 m || 
|-id=630 bgcolor=#fefefe
| 524630 ||  || — || September 18, 2003 || Socorro || LINEAR ||  || align=right data-sort-value="0.81" | 810 m || 
|-id=631 bgcolor=#fefefe
| 524631 ||  || — || September 20, 2003 || Kitt Peak || Spacewatch ||  || align=right data-sort-value="0.81" | 810 m || 
|-id=632 bgcolor=#fefefe
| 524632 ||  || — || September 20, 2003 || Kitt Peak || Spacewatch ||  || align=right data-sort-value="0.59" | 590 m || 
|-id=633 bgcolor=#fefefe
| 524633 ||  || — || September 20, 2003 || Kitt Peak || Spacewatch ||  || align=right data-sort-value="0.70" | 700 m || 
|-id=634 bgcolor=#E9E9E9
| 524634 ||  || — || September 20, 2003 || Kitt Peak || Spacewatch ||  || align=right | 1.9 km || 
|-id=635 bgcolor=#FA8072
| 524635 ||  || — || August 25, 2003 || Socorro || LINEAR ||  || align=right data-sort-value="0.85" | 850 m || 
|-id=636 bgcolor=#fefefe
| 524636 ||  || — || September 21, 2003 || Kitt Peak || Spacewatch ||  || align=right data-sort-value="0.48" | 480 m || 
|-id=637 bgcolor=#fefefe
| 524637 ||  || — || September 18, 2003 || Kitt Peak || Spacewatch || NYS || align=right data-sort-value="0.62" | 620 m || 
|-id=638 bgcolor=#d6d6d6
| 524638 Kaffkamargit ||  ||  || September 21, 2003 || Piszkéstető || K. Sárneczky, B. Sipőcz ||  || align=right | 1.8 km || 
|-id=639 bgcolor=#FA8072
| 524639 ||  || — || September 17, 2003 || Socorro || LINEAR ||  || align=right data-sort-value="0.86" | 860 m || 
|-id=640 bgcolor=#E9E9E9
| 524640 ||  || — || September 18, 2003 || Socorro || LINEAR ||  || align=right | 1.8 km || 
|-id=641 bgcolor=#E9E9E9
| 524641 ||  || — || September 20, 2003 || Anderson Mesa || LONEOS ||  || align=right | 1.4 km || 
|-id=642 bgcolor=#E9E9E9
| 524642 ||  || — || September 21, 2003 || Kitt Peak || Spacewatch ||  || align=right | 1.8 km || 
|-id=643 bgcolor=#E9E9E9
| 524643 ||  || — || September 17, 2003 || Kitt Peak || Spacewatch ||  || align=right | 1.4 km || 
|-id=644 bgcolor=#FA8072
| 524644 ||  || — || September 29, 2003 || Anderson Mesa || LONEOS ||  || align=right data-sort-value="0.32" | 320 m || 
|-id=645 bgcolor=#fefefe
| 524645 ||  || — || September 18, 2003 || Kitt Peak || Spacewatch ||  || align=right data-sort-value="0.70" | 700 m || 
|-id=646 bgcolor=#E9E9E9
| 524646 ||  || — || September 20, 2003 || Socorro || LINEAR ||  || align=right | 1.5 km || 
|-id=647 bgcolor=#E9E9E9
| 524647 ||  || — || October 9, 2008 || Mount Lemmon || Mount Lemmon Survey ||  || align=right | 2.9 km || 
|-id=648 bgcolor=#E9E9E9
| 524648 ||  || — || September 17, 2003 || Kitt Peak || Spacewatch ||  || align=right | 1.2 km || 
|-id=649 bgcolor=#fefefe
| 524649 ||  || — || September 20, 2003 || Socorro || LINEAR ||  || align=right data-sort-value="0.67" | 670 m || 
|-id=650 bgcolor=#fefefe
| 524650 ||  || — || September 21, 2003 || Kitt Peak || Spacewatch ||  || align=right data-sort-value="0.81" | 810 m || 
|-id=651 bgcolor=#fefefe
| 524651 ||  || — || September 17, 2003 || Kitt Peak || Spacewatch ||  || align=right data-sort-value="0.65" | 650 m || 
|-id=652 bgcolor=#d6d6d6
| 524652 ||  || — || September 27, 2003 || Kitt Peak || Spacewatch || 7:4 || align=right | 3.8 km || 
|-id=653 bgcolor=#fefefe
| 524653 ||  || — || September 28, 2003 || Kitt Peak || Spacewatch ||  || align=right data-sort-value="0.84" | 840 m || 
|-id=654 bgcolor=#d6d6d6
| 524654 ||  || — || September 28, 2003 || Socorro || LINEAR ||  || align=right | 1.4 km || 
|-id=655 bgcolor=#d6d6d6
| 524655 ||  || — || September 29, 2003 || Kitt Peak || Spacewatch ||  || align=right | 2.3 km || 
|-id=656 bgcolor=#fefefe
| 524656 ||  || — || September 22, 2003 || Anderson Mesa || LONEOS ||  || align=right data-sort-value="0.79" | 790 m || 
|-id=657 bgcolor=#fefefe
| 524657 ||  || — || September 18, 2003 || Kitt Peak || Spacewatch ||  || align=right data-sort-value="0.76" | 760 m || 
|-id=658 bgcolor=#d6d6d6
| 524658 ||  || — || September 23, 2003 || Palomar || NEAT ||  || align=right | 1.8 km || 
|-id=659 bgcolor=#E9E9E9
| 524659 ||  || — || March 15, 2010 || Kitt Peak || Spacewatch ||  || align=right | 1.3 km || 
|-id=660 bgcolor=#fefefe
| 524660 ||  || — || September 16, 2003 || Kitt Peak || Spacewatch ||  || align=right data-sort-value="0.52" | 520 m || 
|-id=661 bgcolor=#fefefe
| 524661 ||  || — || September 18, 2003 || Kitt Peak || Spacewatch ||  || align=right data-sort-value="0.47" | 470 m || 
|-id=662 bgcolor=#fefefe
| 524662 ||  || — || September 27, 2003 || Kitt Peak || Spacewatch ||  || align=right data-sort-value="0.68" | 680 m || 
|-id=663 bgcolor=#fefefe
| 524663 ||  || — || September 22, 2003 || Kitt Peak || Spacewatch ||  || align=right data-sort-value="0.59" | 590 m || 
|-id=664 bgcolor=#fefefe
| 524664 ||  || — || September 26, 2003 || Apache Point || SDSS ||  || align=right data-sort-value="0.58" | 580 m || 
|-id=665 bgcolor=#E9E9E9
| 524665 ||  || — || September 17, 2003 || Kitt Peak || Spacewatch ||  || align=right | 3.4 km || 
|-id=666 bgcolor=#E9E9E9
| 524666 ||  || — || September 17, 2003 || Kitt Peak || Spacewatch ||  || align=right | 1.0 km || 
|-id=667 bgcolor=#E9E9E9
| 524667 ||  || — || September 20, 2003 || Kitt Peak || Spacewatch ||  || align=right | 1.1 km || 
|-id=668 bgcolor=#fefefe
| 524668 ||  || — || September 21, 2003 || Kitt Peak || Spacewatch ||  || align=right data-sort-value="0.68" | 680 m || 
|-id=669 bgcolor=#E9E9E9
| 524669 ||  || — || September 21, 2003 || Kitt Peak || Spacewatch ||  || align=right | 1.9 km || 
|-id=670 bgcolor=#E9E9E9
| 524670 ||  || — || September 22, 2003 || Kitt Peak || Spacewatch ||  || align=right | 2.0 km || 
|-id=671 bgcolor=#E9E9E9
| 524671 ||  || — || September 27, 2003 || Kitt Peak || Spacewatch ||  || align=right | 2.7 km || 
|-id=672 bgcolor=#fefefe
| 524672 ||  || — || September 19, 2003 || Kitt Peak || Spacewatch ||  || align=right data-sort-value="0.54" | 540 m || 
|-id=673 bgcolor=#d6d6d6
| 524673 ||  || — || September 21, 2003 || Campo Imperatore || CINEOS ||  || align=right | 2.1 km || 
|-id=674 bgcolor=#d6d6d6
| 524674 ||  || — || September 28, 2003 || Apache Point || SDSS ||  || align=right | 2.1 km || 
|-id=675 bgcolor=#fefefe
| 524675 ||  || — || September 16, 2003 || Kitt Peak || Spacewatch ||  || align=right data-sort-value="0.54" | 540 m || 
|-id=676 bgcolor=#fefefe
| 524676 ||  || — || September 18, 2003 || Kitt Peak || Spacewatch ||  || align=right data-sort-value="0.94" | 940 m || 
|-id=677 bgcolor=#E9E9E9
| 524677 ||  || — || October 23, 2008 || Kitt Peak || Spacewatch ||  || align=right | 1.8 km || 
|-id=678 bgcolor=#FA8072
| 524678 ||  || — || October 1, 2003 || Kitt Peak || Spacewatch ||  || align=right | 1.2 km || 
|-id=679 bgcolor=#E9E9E9
| 524679 ||  || — || October 3, 2003 || Kitt Peak || Spacewatch ||  || align=right | 3.0 km || 
|-id=680 bgcolor=#d6d6d6
| 524680 ||  || — || October 1, 2003 || Kitt Peak || Spacewatch ||  || align=right | 2.7 km || 
|-id=681 bgcolor=#E9E9E9
| 524681 ||  || — || October 1, 2003 || Kitt Peak || Spacewatch ||  || align=right | 2.6 km || 
|-id=682 bgcolor=#E9E9E9
| 524682 ||  || — || October 1, 2003 || Kitt Peak || Spacewatch ||  || align=right | 1.6 km || 
|-id=683 bgcolor=#E9E9E9
| 524683 ||  || — || October 1, 2003 || Kitt Peak || Spacewatch ||  || align=right | 1.4 km || 
|-id=684 bgcolor=#d6d6d6
| 524684 ||  || — || September 18, 2003 || Kitt Peak || Spacewatch || Tj (2.98) || align=right | 2.8 km || 
|-id=685 bgcolor=#E9E9E9
| 524685 ||  || — || October 1, 2003 || Kitt Peak || Spacewatch ||  || align=right | 2.0 km || 
|-id=686 bgcolor=#E9E9E9
| 524686 ||  || — || October 1, 2003 || Kitt Peak || Spacewatch ||  || align=right | 1.8 km || 
|-id=687 bgcolor=#fefefe
| 524687 ||  || — || October 1, 2003 || Kitt Peak || Spacewatch ||  || align=right data-sort-value="0.66" | 660 m || 
|-id=688 bgcolor=#fefefe
| 524688 ||  || — || October 1, 2003 || Kitt Peak || Spacewatch ||  || align=right data-sort-value="0.73" | 730 m || 
|-id=689 bgcolor=#E9E9E9
| 524689 ||  || — || October 1, 2003 || Kitt Peak || Spacewatch ||  || align=right | 1.3 km || 
|-id=690 bgcolor=#d6d6d6
| 524690 ||  || — || October 1, 2003 || Kitt Peak || Spacewatch ||  || align=right | 1.7 km || 
|-id=691 bgcolor=#E9E9E9
| 524691 ||  || — || October 2, 2003 || Kitt Peak || Spacewatch ||  || align=right | 1.8 km || 
|-id=692 bgcolor=#fefefe
| 524692 ||  || — || September 16, 2003 || Kitt Peak || Spacewatch ||  || align=right data-sort-value="0.76" | 760 m || 
|-id=693 bgcolor=#fefefe
| 524693 ||  || — || October 3, 2003 || Kitt Peak || Spacewatch ||  || align=right data-sort-value="0.60" | 600 m || 
|-id=694 bgcolor=#E9E9E9
| 524694 ||  || — || October 5, 2003 || Kitt Peak || Spacewatch ||  || align=right | 1.4 km || 
|-id=695 bgcolor=#E9E9E9
| 524695 ||  || — || October 5, 2003 || Kitt Peak || Spacewatch ||  || align=right | 2.6 km || 
|-id=696 bgcolor=#fefefe
| 524696 ||  || — || October 5, 2003 || Kitt Peak || Spacewatch ||  || align=right data-sort-value="0.87" | 870 m || 
|-id=697 bgcolor=#E9E9E9
| 524697 ||  || — || October 2, 2003 || Kitt Peak || Spacewatch ||  || align=right | 1.9 km || 
|-id=698 bgcolor=#fefefe
| 524698 ||  || — || October 2, 2003 || Kitt Peak || Spacewatch ||  || align=right data-sort-value="0.56" | 560 m || 
|-id=699 bgcolor=#E9E9E9
| 524699 ||  || — || October 2, 2003 || Kitt Peak || Spacewatch ||  || align=right | 1.2 km || 
|-id=700 bgcolor=#fefefe
| 524700 ||  || — || September 22, 2003 || Kitt Peak || Spacewatch ||  || align=right data-sort-value="0.57" | 570 m || 
|}

524701–524800 

|-bgcolor=#fefefe
| 524701 ||  || — || October 21, 2003 || Kitt Peak || Spacewatch ||  || align=right data-sort-value="0.63" | 630 m || 
|-id=702 bgcolor=#FA8072
| 524702 ||  || — || October 22, 2003 || Palomar || NEAT ||  || align=right | 1.0 km || 
|-id=703 bgcolor=#fefefe
| 524703 ||  || — || October 22, 2003 || Socorro || LINEAR || H || align=right data-sort-value="0.57" | 570 m || 
|-id=704 bgcolor=#fefefe
| 524704 ||  || — || October 16, 2003 || Goodricke-Pigott || R. A. Tucker ||  || align=right data-sort-value="0.84" | 840 m || 
|-id=705 bgcolor=#E9E9E9
| 524705 ||  || — || October 17, 2003 || Kitt Peak || Spacewatch ||  || align=right | 1.8 km || 
|-id=706 bgcolor=#E9E9E9
| 524706 ||  || — || October 17, 2003 || Kitt Peak || Spacewatch ||  || align=right | 2.4 km || 
|-id=707 bgcolor=#fefefe
| 524707 ||  || — || October 17, 2003 || Anderson Mesa || LONEOS ||  || align=right data-sort-value="0.69" | 690 m || 
|-id=708 bgcolor=#E9E9E9
| 524708 ||  || — || October 17, 2003 || Kitt Peak || Spacewatch ||  || align=right | 1.1 km || 
|-id=709 bgcolor=#fefefe
| 524709 ||  || — || October 17, 2003 || Kitt Peak || Spacewatch ||  || align=right data-sort-value="0.67" | 670 m || 
|-id=710 bgcolor=#E9E9E9
| 524710 ||  || — || October 18, 2003 || Kitt Peak || Spacewatch ||  || align=right | 2.6 km || 
|-id=711 bgcolor=#E9E9E9
| 524711 ||  || — || October 18, 2003 || Kitt Peak || Spacewatch ||  || align=right | 2.0 km || 
|-id=712 bgcolor=#E9E9E9
| 524712 ||  || — || October 16, 2003 || Kitt Peak || Spacewatch ||  || align=right | 2.4 km || 
|-id=713 bgcolor=#fefefe
| 524713 ||  || — || September 29, 2003 || Socorro || LINEAR ||  || align=right data-sort-value="0.85" | 850 m || 
|-id=714 bgcolor=#E9E9E9
| 524714 ||  || — || October 19, 2003 || Kitt Peak || Spacewatch ||  || align=right | 1.7 km || 
|-id=715 bgcolor=#E9E9E9
| 524715 ||  || — || September 28, 2003 || Socorro || LINEAR ||  || align=right | 1.3 km || 
|-id=716 bgcolor=#fefefe
| 524716 ||  || — || September 29, 2003 || Kitt Peak || Spacewatch ||  || align=right data-sort-value="0.65" | 650 m || 
|-id=717 bgcolor=#fefefe
| 524717 ||  || — || October 19, 2003 || Kitt Peak || Spacewatch || NYS || align=right data-sort-value="0.60" | 600 m || 
|-id=718 bgcolor=#fefefe
| 524718 ||  || — || October 19, 2003 || Kitt Peak || Spacewatch ||  || align=right data-sort-value="0.83" | 830 m || 
|-id=719 bgcolor=#fefefe
| 524719 ||  || — || October 19, 2003 || Kitt Peak || Spacewatch ||  || align=right data-sort-value="0.61" | 610 m || 
|-id=720 bgcolor=#fefefe
| 524720 ||  || — || September 22, 2003 || Kitt Peak || Spacewatch ||  || align=right data-sort-value="0.67" | 670 m || 
|-id=721 bgcolor=#d6d6d6
| 524721 ||  || — || October 4, 2003 || Kitt Peak || Spacewatch ||  || align=right | 2.8 km || 
|-id=722 bgcolor=#fefefe
| 524722 ||  || — || October 20, 2003 || Socorro || LINEAR ||  || align=right data-sort-value="0.83" | 830 m || 
|-id=723 bgcolor=#E9E9E9
| 524723 ||  || — || October 5, 2003 || Kitt Peak || Spacewatch ||  || align=right | 2.1 km || 
|-id=724 bgcolor=#E9E9E9
| 524724 ||  || — || October 16, 2003 || Kitt Peak || Spacewatch ||  || align=right | 2.1 km || 
|-id=725 bgcolor=#E9E9E9
| 524725 ||  || — || October 21, 2003 || Socorro || LINEAR ||  || align=right | 1.4 km || 
|-id=726 bgcolor=#E9E9E9
| 524726 ||  || — || October 22, 2003 || Socorro || LINEAR ||  || align=right | 2.6 km || 
|-id=727 bgcolor=#fefefe
| 524727 ||  || — || October 21, 2003 || Socorro || LINEAR || MAS || align=right data-sort-value="0.64" | 640 m || 
|-id=728 bgcolor=#fefefe
| 524728 ||  || — || September 21, 2003 || Kitt Peak || Spacewatch || NYS || align=right data-sort-value="0.51" | 510 m || 
|-id=729 bgcolor=#fefefe
| 524729 ||  || — || September 29, 2003 || Kitt Peak || Spacewatch ||  || align=right data-sort-value="0.84" | 840 m || 
|-id=730 bgcolor=#fefefe
| 524730 ||  || — || October 21, 2003 || Kitt Peak || Spacewatch ||  || align=right data-sort-value="0.80" | 800 m || 
|-id=731 bgcolor=#E9E9E9
| 524731 ||  || — || October 21, 2003 || Kitt Peak || Spacewatch ||  || align=right | 2.0 km || 
|-id=732 bgcolor=#fefefe
| 524732 ||  || — || October 21, 2003 || Kitt Peak || Spacewatch ||  || align=right | 1.2 km || 
|-id=733 bgcolor=#fefefe
| 524733 ||  || — || September 19, 2003 || Kitt Peak || Spacewatch ||  || align=right data-sort-value="0.55" | 550 m || 
|-id=734 bgcolor=#fefefe
| 524734 ||  || — || October 22, 2003 || Kitt Peak || Spacewatch ||  || align=right data-sort-value="0.83" | 830 m || 
|-id=735 bgcolor=#fefefe
| 524735 ||  || — || September 28, 2003 || Kitt Peak || Spacewatch ||  || align=right data-sort-value="0.68" | 680 m || 
|-id=736 bgcolor=#d6d6d6
| 524736 ||  || — || October 22, 2003 || Kitt Peak || Spacewatch || Tj (2.92) || align=right | 3.3 km || 
|-id=737 bgcolor=#E9E9E9
| 524737 ||  || — || October 3, 2003 || Kitt Peak || Spacewatch ||  || align=right | 1.7 km || 
|-id=738 bgcolor=#E9E9E9
| 524738 ||  || — || October 24, 2003 || Socorro || LINEAR ||  || align=right | 2.4 km || 
|-id=739 bgcolor=#E9E9E9
| 524739 ||  || — || October 19, 2003 || Kitt Peak || Spacewatch ||  || align=right | 2.1 km || 
|-id=740 bgcolor=#fefefe
| 524740 ||  || — || October 24, 2003 || Kitt Peak || Spacewatch ||  || align=right data-sort-value="0.67" | 670 m || 
|-id=741 bgcolor=#fefefe
| 524741 ||  || — || October 21, 2003 || Kitt Peak || Spacewatch ||  || align=right data-sort-value="0.44" | 440 m || 
|-id=742 bgcolor=#fefefe
| 524742 ||  || — || October 21, 2003 || Kitt Peak || Spacewatch ||  || align=right data-sort-value="0.68" | 680 m || 
|-id=743 bgcolor=#d6d6d6
| 524743 ||  || — || October 28, 2003 || Socorro || LINEAR || unusual || align=right | 2.3 km || 
|-id=744 bgcolor=#fefefe
| 524744 ||  || — || October 28, 2003 || Socorro || LINEAR ||  || align=right data-sort-value="0.79" | 790 m || 
|-id=745 bgcolor=#fefefe
| 524745 ||  || — || October 17, 2003 || Kitt Peak || Spacewatch ||  || align=right data-sort-value="0.76" | 760 m || 
|-id=746 bgcolor=#fefefe
| 524746 ||  || — || October 19, 2003 || Kitt Peak || Spacewatch ||  || align=right data-sort-value="0.87" | 870 m || 
|-id=747 bgcolor=#C2E0FF
| 524747 ||  || — || October 24, 2003 || Kitt Peak || M. W. Buie || SDO || align=right | 185 km || 
|-id=748 bgcolor=#fefefe
| 524748 ||  || — || September 22, 2003 || Kitt Peak || Spacewatch ||  || align=right data-sort-value="0.62" | 620 m || 
|-id=749 bgcolor=#d6d6d6
| 524749 ||  || — || October 16, 2003 || Kitt Peak || Spacewatch ||  || align=right | 2.5 km || 
|-id=750 bgcolor=#E9E9E9
| 524750 ||  || — || October 16, 2003 || Kitt Peak || Spacewatch ||  || align=right | 2.1 km || 
|-id=751 bgcolor=#d6d6d6
| 524751 ||  || — || October 17, 2003 || Anderson Mesa || LONEOS ||  || align=right | 2.6 km || 
|-id=752 bgcolor=#E9E9E9
| 524752 ||  || — || October 17, 2003 || Kitt Peak || Spacewatch ||  || align=right | 1.6 km || 
|-id=753 bgcolor=#E9E9E9
| 524753 ||  || — || October 3, 2003 || Kitt Peak || Spacewatch ||  || align=right | 1.3 km || 
|-id=754 bgcolor=#E9E9E9
| 524754 ||  || — || October 17, 2003 || Kitt Peak || Spacewatch ||  || align=right | 1.7 km || 
|-id=755 bgcolor=#E9E9E9
| 524755 ||  || — || October 18, 2003 || Kitt Peak || Spacewatch ||  || align=right | 2.0 km || 
|-id=756 bgcolor=#E9E9E9
| 524756 ||  || — || October 18, 2003 || Kitt Peak || Spacewatch ||  || align=right | 1.9 km || 
|-id=757 bgcolor=#fefefe
| 524757 ||  || — || September 18, 2003 || Kitt Peak || Spacewatch ||  || align=right data-sort-value="0.83" | 830 m || 
|-id=758 bgcolor=#E9E9E9
| 524758 ||  || — || October 18, 2003 || Kitt Peak || Spacewatch ||  || align=right | 1.8 km || 
|-id=759 bgcolor=#fefefe
| 524759 ||  || — || July 7, 2010 || WISE || WISE ||  || align=right | 1.0 km || 
|-id=760 bgcolor=#fefefe
| 524760 ||  || — || October 25, 2003 || Kitt Peak || Spacewatch ||  || align=right data-sort-value="0.82" | 820 m || 
|-id=761 bgcolor=#d6d6d6
| 524761 ||  || — || October 22, 2003 || Kitt Peak || Spacewatch ||  || align=right | 2.0 km || 
|-id=762 bgcolor=#fefefe
| 524762 ||  || — || October 24, 2003 || Socorro || LINEAR ||  || align=right data-sort-value="0.65" | 650 m || 
|-id=763 bgcolor=#d6d6d6
| 524763 ||  || — || September 20, 2003 || Kitt Peak || Spacewatch || 7:4 || align=right | 2.7 km || 
|-id=764 bgcolor=#E9E9E9
| 524764 ||  || — || September 20, 2003 || Kitt Peak || Spacewatch ||  || align=right | 1.3 km || 
|-id=765 bgcolor=#E9E9E9
| 524765 ||  || — || October 16, 2003 || Kitt Peak || Spacewatch ||  || align=right | 1.9 km || 
|-id=766 bgcolor=#FA8072
| 524766 ||  || — || October 17, 2003 || Apache Point || SDSS || H || align=right data-sort-value="0.47" | 470 m || 
|-id=767 bgcolor=#fefefe
| 524767 ||  || — || October 18, 2003 || Apache Point || SDSS ||  || align=right data-sort-value="0.44" | 440 m || 
|-id=768 bgcolor=#d6d6d6
| 524768 ||  || — || October 18, 2003 || Apache Point || SDSS ||  || align=right | 1.5 km || 
|-id=769 bgcolor=#E9E9E9
| 524769 ||  || — || September 30, 2003 || Kitt Peak || Spacewatch ||  || align=right | 1.9 km || 
|-id=770 bgcolor=#E9E9E9
| 524770 ||  || — || September 18, 2003 || Kitt Peak || Spacewatch ||  || align=right data-sort-value="0.91" | 910 m || 
|-id=771 bgcolor=#fefefe
| 524771 ||  || — || September 30, 2003 || Kitt Peak || Spacewatch ||  || align=right data-sort-value="0.68" | 680 m || 
|-id=772 bgcolor=#E9E9E9
| 524772 ||  || — || October 19, 2003 || Kitt Peak || Spacewatch ||  || align=right | 1.7 km || 
|-id=773 bgcolor=#fefefe
| 524773 ||  || — || October 19, 2003 || Kitt Peak || Spacewatch ||  || align=right data-sort-value="0.70" | 700 m || 
|-id=774 bgcolor=#fefefe
| 524774 ||  || — || October 19, 2003 || Kitt Peak || Spacewatch ||  || align=right data-sort-value="0.47" | 470 m || 
|-id=775 bgcolor=#fefefe
| 524775 ||  || — || September 28, 2003 || Kitt Peak || Spacewatch ||  || align=right data-sort-value="0.78" | 780 m || 
|-id=776 bgcolor=#E9E9E9
| 524776 ||  || — || September 27, 2003 || Kitt Peak || Spacewatch ||  || align=right | 1.9 km || 
|-id=777 bgcolor=#fefefe
| 524777 ||  || — || September 21, 2003 || Kitt Peak || Spacewatch ||  || align=right data-sort-value="0.85" | 850 m || 
|-id=778 bgcolor=#fefefe
| 524778 ||  || — || October 20, 2003 || Kitt Peak || Spacewatch ||  || align=right data-sort-value="0.75" | 750 m || 
|-id=779 bgcolor=#fefefe
| 524779 ||  || — || October 20, 2003 || Kitt Peak || Spacewatch ||  || align=right data-sort-value="0.59" | 590 m || 
|-id=780 bgcolor=#fefefe
| 524780 ||  || — || October 20, 2003 || Kitt Peak || Spacewatch ||  || align=right data-sort-value="0.85" | 850 m || 
|-id=781 bgcolor=#E9E9E9
| 524781 ||  || — || October 2, 2003 || Kitt Peak || Spacewatch ||  || align=right | 2.5 km || 
|-id=782 bgcolor=#E9E9E9
| 524782 ||  || — || October 21, 2003 || Kitt Peak || Spacewatch ||  || align=right | 1.7 km || 
|-id=783 bgcolor=#fefefe
| 524783 ||  || — || October 21, 2003 || Kitt Peak || Spacewatch ||  || align=right data-sort-value="0.99" | 990 m || 
|-id=784 bgcolor=#fefefe
| 524784 ||  || — || October 22, 2003 || Kitt Peak || Spacewatch ||  || align=right data-sort-value="0.56" | 560 m || 
|-id=785 bgcolor=#fefefe
| 524785 ||  || — || October 23, 2003 || Apache Point || SDSS ||  || align=right data-sort-value="0.52" | 520 m || 
|-id=786 bgcolor=#fefefe
| 524786 ||  || — || October 20, 2003 || Kitt Peak || Spacewatch ||  || align=right data-sort-value="0.65" | 650 m || 
|-id=787 bgcolor=#E9E9E9
| 524787 ||  || — || September 19, 2003 || Kitt Peak || Spacewatch ||  || align=right | 1.9 km || 
|-id=788 bgcolor=#E9E9E9
| 524788 ||  || — || November 15, 2003 || Kitt Peak || Spacewatch ||  || align=right | 2.4 km || 
|-id=789 bgcolor=#fefefe
| 524789 ||  || — || November 16, 2003 || Kitt Peak || Spacewatch ||  || align=right data-sort-value="0.66" | 660 m || 
|-id=790 bgcolor=#d6d6d6
| 524790 ||  || — || October 27, 2003 || Kitt Peak || Spacewatch ||  || align=right | 2.7 km || 
|-id=791 bgcolor=#fefefe
| 524791 ||  || — || October 19, 2003 || Kitt Peak || Spacewatch ||  || align=right data-sort-value="0.79" | 790 m || 
|-id=792 bgcolor=#d6d6d6
| 524792 ||  || — || November 19, 2003 || Socorro || LINEAR ||  || align=right | 3.7 km || 
|-id=793 bgcolor=#fefefe
| 524793 ||  || — || November 17, 2003 || Catalina || CSS ||  || align=right data-sort-value="0.74" | 740 m || 
|-id=794 bgcolor=#d6d6d6
| 524794 ||  || — || November 19, 2003 || Kitt Peak || Spacewatch ||  || align=right | 3.1 km || 
|-id=795 bgcolor=#fefefe
| 524795 ||  || — || November 19, 2003 || Anderson Mesa || LONEOS ||  || align=right data-sort-value="0.70" | 700 m || 
|-id=796 bgcolor=#E9E9E9
| 524796 ||  || — || September 27, 2003 || Kitt Peak || Spacewatch ||  || align=right | 2.1 km || 
|-id=797 bgcolor=#fefefe
| 524797 ||  || — || November 20, 2003 || Socorro || LINEAR ||  || align=right | 1.1 km || 
|-id=798 bgcolor=#d6d6d6
| 524798 ||  || — || November 20, 2003 || Socorro || LINEAR ||  || align=right | 2.9 km || 
|-id=799 bgcolor=#fefefe
| 524799 ||  || — || November 21, 2003 || Socorro || LINEAR ||  || align=right data-sort-value="0.84" | 840 m || 
|-id=800 bgcolor=#fefefe
| 524800 ||  || — || November 21, 2003 || Socorro || LINEAR ||  || align=right data-sort-value="0.62" | 620 m || 
|}

524801–524900 

|-bgcolor=#FA8072
| 524801 ||  || — || November 29, 2003 || Socorro || LINEAR ||  || align=right | 1.5 km || 
|-id=802 bgcolor=#fefefe
| 524802 ||  || — || November 29, 2003 || Kitt Peak || Spacewatch ||  || align=right data-sort-value="0.67" | 670 m || 
|-id=803 bgcolor=#E9E9E9
| 524803 ||  || — || October 29, 2003 || Kitt Peak || Spacewatch ||  || align=right | 2.3 km || 
|-id=804 bgcolor=#d6d6d6
| 524804 ||  || — || November 30, 2003 || Kitt Peak || Spacewatch ||  || align=right | 1.8 km || 
|-id=805 bgcolor=#E9E9E9
| 524805 ||  || — || November 18, 2003 || Kitt Peak || Spacewatch ||  || align=right | 1.8 km || 
|-id=806 bgcolor=#fefefe
| 524806 ||  || — || November 19, 2003 || Kitt Peak || Spacewatch ||  || align=right data-sort-value="0.74" | 740 m || 
|-id=807 bgcolor=#fefefe
| 524807 ||  || — || October 22, 2003 || Kitt Peak || Spacewatch ||  || align=right data-sort-value="0.54" | 540 m || 
|-id=808 bgcolor=#E9E9E9
| 524808 ||  || — || October 19, 2003 || Kitt Peak || Spacewatch ||  || align=right | 1.7 km || 
|-id=809 bgcolor=#fefefe
| 524809 ||  || — || November 24, 2003 || Kitt Peak || Spacewatch ||  || align=right data-sort-value="0.71" | 710 m || 
|-id=810 bgcolor=#FA8072
| 524810 ||  || — || November 16, 2003 || Apache Point || SDSS ||  || align=right data-sort-value="0.57" | 570 m || 
|-id=811 bgcolor=#fefefe
| 524811 ||  || — || November 19, 2003 || Kitt Peak || Spacewatch ||  || align=right data-sort-value="0.56" | 560 m || 
|-id=812 bgcolor=#fefefe
| 524812 ||  || — || November 24, 2003 || Anderson Mesa || LONEOS ||  || align=right | 1.0 km || 
|-id=813 bgcolor=#d6d6d6
| 524813 ||  || — || December 14, 2003 || Kitt Peak || Spacewatch ||  || align=right | 3.2 km || 
|-id=814 bgcolor=#d6d6d6
| 524814 ||  || — || December 1, 2003 || Kitt Peak || Spacewatch ||  || align=right | 2.3 km || 
|-id=815 bgcolor=#E9E9E9
| 524815 ||  || — || December 1, 2003 || Kitt Peak || Spacewatch ||  || align=right | 1.7 km || 
|-id=816 bgcolor=#fefefe
| 524816 ||  || — || December 1, 2003 || Kitt Peak || Spacewatch ||  || align=right data-sort-value="0.68" | 680 m || 
|-id=817 bgcolor=#fefefe
| 524817 ||  || — || December 3, 2003 || Socorro || LINEAR || H || align=right data-sort-value="0.86" | 860 m || 
|-id=818 bgcolor=#FA8072
| 524818 ||  || — || December 19, 2003 || Kingsnake || J. V. McClusky ||  || align=right | 1.00 km || 
|-id=819 bgcolor=#FA8072
| 524819 ||  || — || December 19, 2003 || Socorro || LINEAR ||  || align=right | 1.1 km || 
|-id=820 bgcolor=#d6d6d6
| 524820 ||  || — || December 17, 2003 || Socorro || LINEAR ||  || align=right | 3.0 km || 
|-id=821 bgcolor=#d6d6d6
| 524821 ||  || — || November 19, 2003 || Socorro || LINEAR ||  || align=right | 2.8 km || 
|-id=822 bgcolor=#d6d6d6
| 524822 ||  || — || December 18, 2003 || Socorro || LINEAR ||  || align=right | 2.9 km || 
|-id=823 bgcolor=#fefefe
| 524823 ||  || — || December 19, 2003 || Kitt Peak || Spacewatch ||  || align=right data-sort-value="0.90" | 900 m || 
|-id=824 bgcolor=#E9E9E9
| 524824 ||  || — || December 19, 2003 || Kitt Peak || Spacewatch ||  || align=right | 3.0 km || 
|-id=825 bgcolor=#fefefe
| 524825 ||  || — || December 21, 2003 || Kitt Peak || Spacewatch ||  || align=right data-sort-value="0.90" | 900 m || 
|-id=826 bgcolor=#E9E9E9
| 524826 ||  || — || December 19, 2003 || Socorro || LINEAR ||  || align=right | 2.7 km || 
|-id=827 bgcolor=#fefefe
| 524827 ||  || — || December 19, 2003 || Socorro || LINEAR ||  || align=right data-sort-value="0.60" | 600 m || 
|-id=828 bgcolor=#d6d6d6
| 524828 ||  || — || December 3, 2003 || Socorro || LINEAR ||  || align=right | 4.1 km || 
|-id=829 bgcolor=#fefefe
| 524829 ||  || — || November 29, 2003 || Kitt Peak || Spacewatch ||  || align=right data-sort-value="0.76" | 760 m || 
|-id=830 bgcolor=#d6d6d6
| 524830 ||  || — || December 28, 2003 || Socorro || LINEAR ||  || align=right | 2.7 km || 
|-id=831 bgcolor=#fefefe
| 524831 ||  || — || December 16, 2003 || Kitt Peak || Spacewatch ||  || align=right data-sort-value="0.88" | 880 m || 
|-id=832 bgcolor=#d6d6d6
| 524832 ||  || — || December 17, 2003 || Socorro || LINEAR ||  || align=right | 3.4 km || 
|-id=833 bgcolor=#d6d6d6
| 524833 ||  || — || December 18, 2003 || Kitt Peak || Spacewatch ||  || align=right | 2.9 km || 
|-id=834 bgcolor=#C2E0FF
| 524834 ||  || — || December 16, 2003 || Mauna Kea || Mauna Kea Obs. || other TNO || align=right | 154 km || 
|-id=835 bgcolor=#d6d6d6
| 524835 ||  || — || January 13, 2004 || Kitt Peak || Spacewatch ||  || align=right | 1.9 km || 
|-id=836 bgcolor=#E9E9E9
| 524836 ||  || — || January 15, 2004 || Kitt Peak || Spacewatch ||  || align=right | 2.3 km || 
|-id=837 bgcolor=#d6d6d6
| 524837 ||  || — || January 15, 2004 || Kitt Peak || Spacewatch ||  || align=right | 4.7 km || 
|-id=838 bgcolor=#fefefe
| 524838 ||  || — || January 15, 2004 || Kitt Peak || Spacewatch ||  || align=right data-sort-value="0.86" | 860 m || 
|-id=839 bgcolor=#fefefe
| 524839 ||  || — || January 15, 2004 || Kitt Peak || Spacewatch ||  || align=right data-sort-value="0.70" | 700 m || 
|-id=840 bgcolor=#d6d6d6
| 524840 ||  || — || January 15, 2004 || Kitt Peak || Spacewatch ||  || align=right | 2.8 km || 
|-id=841 bgcolor=#d6d6d6
| 524841 ||  || — || January 15, 2004 || Kitt Peak || Spacewatch ||  || align=right | 2.8 km || 
|-id=842 bgcolor=#d6d6d6
| 524842 ||  || — || January 15, 2004 || Kitt Peak || Spacewatch ||  || align=right | 3.6 km || 
|-id=843 bgcolor=#d6d6d6
| 524843 ||  || — || January 19, 2004 || Kitt Peak || Spacewatch ||  || align=right | 2.4 km || 
|-id=844 bgcolor=#d6d6d6
| 524844 ||  || — || January 19, 2004 || Kitt Peak || Spacewatch ||  || align=right | 3.4 km || 
|-id=845 bgcolor=#d6d6d6
| 524845 ||  || — || January 15, 2004 || Kitt Peak || Spacewatch ||  || align=right | 3.0 km || 
|-id=846 bgcolor=#fefefe
| 524846 ||  || — || December 27, 2003 || Socorro || LINEAR || H || align=right data-sort-value="0.83" | 830 m || 
|-id=847 bgcolor=#d6d6d6
| 524847 ||  || — || January 19, 2004 || Kitt Peak || Spacewatch ||  || align=right | 2.0 km || 
|-id=848 bgcolor=#fefefe
| 524848 ||  || — || January 28, 2004 || Kitt Peak || Spacewatch ||  || align=right data-sort-value="0.70" | 700 m || 
|-id=849 bgcolor=#E9E9E9
| 524849 ||  || — || January 16, 2004 || Kitt Peak || Spacewatch ||  || align=right | 1.8 km || 
|-id=850 bgcolor=#d6d6d6
| 524850 ||  || — || January 16, 2004 || Kitt Peak || Spacewatch || 3:2 || align=right | 6.1 km || 
|-id=851 bgcolor=#d6d6d6
| 524851 ||  || — || January 16, 2004 || Kitt Peak || Spacewatch ||  || align=right | 3.2 km || 
|-id=852 bgcolor=#d6d6d6
| 524852 ||  || — || January 19, 2004 || Kitt Peak || Spacewatch ||  || align=right | 2.4 km || 
|-id=853 bgcolor=#fefefe
| 524853 ||  || — || January 19, 2004 || Kitt Peak || Spacewatch ||  || align=right data-sort-value="0.68" | 680 m || 
|-id=854 bgcolor=#E9E9E9
| 524854 ||  || — || January 19, 2004 || Kitt Peak || Spacewatch ||  || align=right | 2.0 km || 
|-id=855 bgcolor=#d6d6d6
| 524855 ||  || — || January 19, 2004 || Kitt Peak || Spacewatch ||  || align=right | 2.3 km || 
|-id=856 bgcolor=#d6d6d6
| 524856 ||  || — || January 27, 2004 || Kitt Peak || Spacewatch ||  || align=right | 2.2 km || 
|-id=857 bgcolor=#E9E9E9
| 524857 ||  || — || January 27, 2004 || Kitt Peak || Spacewatch ||  || align=right | 2.5 km || 
|-id=858 bgcolor=#d6d6d6
| 524858 ||  || — || March 25, 2015 || Haleakala || Pan-STARRS ||  || align=right | 2.1 km || 
|-id=859 bgcolor=#d6d6d6
| 524859 ||  || — || February 11, 2004 || Kitt Peak || Spacewatch ||  || align=right | 2.0 km || 
|-id=860 bgcolor=#d6d6d6
| 524860 ||  || — || February 11, 2004 || Kitt Peak || Spacewatch ||  || align=right | 2.0 km || 
|-id=861 bgcolor=#d6d6d6
| 524861 ||  || — || January 22, 2004 || Socorro || LINEAR || 3:2 || align=right | 4.1 km || 
|-id=862 bgcolor=#fefefe
| 524862 ||  || — || February 11, 2004 || Kitt Peak || Spacewatch ||  || align=right data-sort-value="0.98" | 980 m || 
|-id=863 bgcolor=#d6d6d6
| 524863 ||  || — || January 19, 2004 || Kitt Peak || Spacewatch ||  || align=right | 3.1 km || 
|-id=864 bgcolor=#E9E9E9
| 524864 ||  || — || January 30, 2004 || Kitt Peak || Spacewatch ||  || align=right | 2.3 km || 
|-id=865 bgcolor=#fefefe
| 524865 ||  || — || February 12, 2004 || Kitt Peak || Spacewatch ||  || align=right data-sort-value="0.63" | 630 m || 
|-id=866 bgcolor=#d6d6d6
| 524866 ||  || — || February 13, 2004 || Kitt Peak || Spacewatch ||  || align=right | 3.1 km || 
|-id=867 bgcolor=#fefefe
| 524867 ||  || — || February 13, 2004 || Kitt Peak || Spacewatch ||  || align=right data-sort-value="0.69" | 690 m || 
|-id=868 bgcolor=#fefefe
| 524868 ||  || — || February 12, 2004 || Desert Eagle || W. K. Y. Yeung || H || align=right data-sort-value="0.65" | 650 m || 
|-id=869 bgcolor=#d6d6d6
| 524869 ||  || — || February 11, 2004 || Kitt Peak || Spacewatch ||  || align=right | 1.8 km || 
|-id=870 bgcolor=#fefefe
| 524870 ||  || — || October 23, 1995 || Kitt Peak || Spacewatch ||  || align=right data-sort-value="0.70" | 700 m || 
|-id=871 bgcolor=#fefefe
| 524871 ||  || — || February 11, 2004 || Kitt Peak || Spacewatch || MAS || align=right data-sort-value="0.46" | 460 m || 
|-id=872 bgcolor=#d6d6d6
| 524872 ||  || — || February 12, 2004 || Kitt Peak || Spacewatch ||  || align=right | 2.8 km || 
|-id=873 bgcolor=#fefefe
| 524873 ||  || — || February 17, 2004 || Socorro || LINEAR || H || align=right data-sort-value="0.65" | 650 m || 
|-id=874 bgcolor=#fefefe
| 524874 ||  || — || February 16, 2004 || Kitt Peak || Spacewatch ||  || align=right data-sort-value="0.69" | 690 m || 
|-id=875 bgcolor=#d6d6d6
| 524875 ||  || — || February 18, 2004 || Kitt Peak || Spacewatch ||  || align=right | 2.7 km || 
|-id=876 bgcolor=#E9E9E9
| 524876 ||  || — || February 16, 2004 || Kitt Peak || Spacewatch ||  || align=right | 1.5 km || 
|-id=877 bgcolor=#d6d6d6
| 524877 ||  || — || February 17, 2004 || Socorro || LINEAR ||  || align=right | 2.8 km || 
|-id=878 bgcolor=#d6d6d6
| 524878 ||  || — || February 17, 2004 || Kitt Peak || Spacewatch ||  || align=right | 2.5 km || 
|-id=879 bgcolor=#d6d6d6
| 524879 ||  || — || February 17, 2004 || Kitt Peak || Spacewatch ||  || align=right | 2.2 km || 
|-id=880 bgcolor=#fefefe
| 524880 ||  || — || February 16, 2004 || Calvin-Rehoboth || L. A. Molnar ||  || align=right data-sort-value="0.57" | 570 m || 
|-id=881 bgcolor=#d6d6d6
| 524881 ||  || — || March 15, 2004 || Kitt Peak || Spacewatch ||  || align=right | 2.6 km || 
|-id=882 bgcolor=#fefefe
| 524882 ||  || — || March 15, 2004 || Socorro || LINEAR ||  || align=right data-sort-value="0.57" | 570 m || 
|-id=883 bgcolor=#d6d6d6
| 524883 ||  || — || March 15, 2004 || Kitt Peak || Spacewatch ||  || align=right | 4.4 km || 
|-id=884 bgcolor=#fefefe
| 524884 ||  || — || March 15, 2004 || Socorro || LINEAR || H || align=right data-sort-value="0.73" | 730 m || 
|-id=885 bgcolor=#fefefe
| 524885 ||  || — || March 15, 2004 || Kitt Peak || Spacewatch ||  || align=right data-sort-value="0.83" | 830 m || 
|-id=886 bgcolor=#d6d6d6
| 524886 ||  || — || March 15, 2004 || Kitt Peak || Spacewatch ||  || align=right | 1.7 km || 
|-id=887 bgcolor=#E9E9E9
| 524887 ||  || — || March 15, 2004 || Kitt Peak || Spacewatch ||  || align=right data-sort-value="0.99" | 990 m || 
|-id=888 bgcolor=#d6d6d6
| 524888 ||  || — || March 15, 2004 || Kitt Peak || Spacewatch ||  || align=right | 2.6 km || 
|-id=889 bgcolor=#d6d6d6
| 524889 ||  || — || March 15, 2004 || Kitt Peak || Spacewatch ||  || align=right | 2.8 km || 
|-id=890 bgcolor=#d6d6d6
| 524890 ||  || — || March 15, 2004 || Kitt Peak || Spacewatch ||  || align=right | 3.2 km || 
|-id=891 bgcolor=#fefefe
| 524891 ||  || — || March 15, 2004 || Kitt Peak || Spacewatch ||  || align=right data-sort-value="0.71" | 710 m || 
|-id=892 bgcolor=#d6d6d6
| 524892 ||  || — || March 15, 2004 || Kitt Peak || Spacewatch ||  || align=right | 2.4 km || 
|-id=893 bgcolor=#d6d6d6
| 524893 ||  || — || March 15, 2004 || Kitt Peak || Spacewatch ||  || align=right | 2.0 km || 
|-id=894 bgcolor=#d6d6d6
| 524894 ||  || — || March 15, 2004 || Kitt Peak || Spacewatch ||  || align=right | 1.7 km || 
|-id=895 bgcolor=#d6d6d6
| 524895 ||  || — || February 11, 2004 || Kitt Peak || Spacewatch ||  || align=right | 4.1 km || 
|-id=896 bgcolor=#fefefe
| 524896 ||  || — || March 15, 2004 || Catalina || CSS ||  || align=right data-sort-value="0.78" | 780 m || 
|-id=897 bgcolor=#E9E9E9
| 524897 ||  || — || March 16, 2004 || Kitt Peak || Spacewatch ||  || align=right data-sort-value="0.98" | 980 m || 
|-id=898 bgcolor=#E9E9E9
| 524898 ||  || — || March 17, 2004 || Siding Spring || SSS ||  || align=right | 2.1 km || 
|-id=899 bgcolor=#d6d6d6
| 524899 ||  || — || March 18, 2004 || Kitt Peak || Spacewatch ||  || align=right | 2.4 km || 
|-id=900 bgcolor=#FA8072
| 524900 ||  || — || March 30, 2004 || Socorro || LINEAR ||  || align=right | 2.0 km || 
|}

524901–525000 

|-bgcolor=#d6d6d6
| 524901 ||  || — || March 18, 2004 || Socorro || LINEAR ||  || align=right | 5.5 km || 
|-id=902 bgcolor=#fefefe
| 524902 ||  || — || March 18, 2004 || Kitt Peak || Spacewatch ||  || align=right data-sort-value="0.75" | 750 m || 
|-id=903 bgcolor=#d6d6d6
| 524903 ||  || — || March 18, 2004 || Kitt Peak || Spacewatch ||  || align=right | 2.7 km || 
|-id=904 bgcolor=#d6d6d6
| 524904 ||  || — || February 29, 2004 || Kitt Peak || Spacewatch ||  || align=right | 3.5 km || 
|-id=905 bgcolor=#d6d6d6
| 524905 ||  || — || March 17, 2004 || Kitt Peak || Spacewatch ||  || align=right | 2.5 km || 
|-id=906 bgcolor=#fefefe
| 524906 ||  || — || March 18, 2004 || Socorro || LINEAR ||  || align=right | 1.0 km || 
|-id=907 bgcolor=#d6d6d6
| 524907 ||  || — || March 17, 2004 || Kitt Peak || Spacewatch ||  || align=right | 3.3 km || 
|-id=908 bgcolor=#fefefe
| 524908 ||  || — || March 17, 2004 || Kitt Peak || Spacewatch ||  || align=right data-sort-value="0.65" | 650 m || 
|-id=909 bgcolor=#d6d6d6
| 524909 ||  || — || March 17, 2004 || Kitt Peak || Spacewatch ||  || align=right | 2.4 km || 
|-id=910 bgcolor=#fefefe
| 524910 ||  || — || March 17, 2004 || Kitt Peak || Spacewatch ||  || align=right data-sort-value="0.75" | 750 m || 
|-id=911 bgcolor=#d6d6d6
| 524911 ||  || — || March 19, 2004 || Kitt Peak || Spacewatch ||  || align=right | 2.4 km || 
|-id=912 bgcolor=#d6d6d6
| 524912 ||  || — || March 19, 2004 || Kitt Peak || Spacewatch ||  || align=right | 2.0 km || 
|-id=913 bgcolor=#fefefe
| 524913 ||  || — || March 20, 2004 || Socorro || LINEAR ||  || align=right data-sort-value="0.92" | 920 m || 
|-id=914 bgcolor=#fefefe
| 524914 ||  || — || February 29, 2004 || Kitt Peak || Spacewatch ||  || align=right data-sort-value="0.86" | 860 m || 
|-id=915 bgcolor=#d6d6d6
| 524915 ||  || — || March 18, 2004 || Catalina || CSS ||  || align=right | 3.4 km || 
|-id=916 bgcolor=#d6d6d6
| 524916 ||  || — || March 21, 2004 || Kitt Peak || Spacewatch ||  || align=right | 2.9 km || 
|-id=917 bgcolor=#d6d6d6
| 524917 ||  || — || March 22, 2004 || Socorro || LINEAR ||  || align=right | 2.2 km || 
|-id=918 bgcolor=#fefefe
| 524918 ||  || — || March 26, 2004 || Kitt Peak || Spacewatch ||  || align=right data-sort-value="0.70" | 700 m || 
|-id=919 bgcolor=#E9E9E9
| 524919 ||  || — || March 23, 2004 || Socorro || LINEAR ||  || align=right | 1.2 km || 
|-id=920 bgcolor=#d6d6d6
| 524920 ||  || — || March 17, 2004 || Kitt Peak || Spacewatch ||  || align=right | 2.7 km || 
|-id=921 bgcolor=#d6d6d6
| 524921 ||  || — || March 17, 2004 || Kitt Peak || Spacewatch ||  || align=right | 2.8 km || 
|-id=922 bgcolor=#fefefe
| 524922 ||  || — || March 17, 2004 || Kitt Peak || Spacewatch ||  || align=right data-sort-value="0.62" | 620 m || 
|-id=923 bgcolor=#fefefe
| 524923 ||  || — || April 12, 2004 || Kitt Peak || Spacewatch ||  || align=right data-sort-value="0.75" | 750 m || 
|-id=924 bgcolor=#fefefe
| 524924 ||  || — || March 27, 2004 || Socorro || LINEAR || H || align=right data-sort-value="0.81" | 810 m || 
|-id=925 bgcolor=#fefefe
| 524925 ||  || — || March 16, 2004 || Kitt Peak || Spacewatch || NYS || align=right data-sort-value="0.66" | 660 m || 
|-id=926 bgcolor=#fefefe
| 524926 ||  || — || April 13, 2004 || Kitt Peak || Spacewatch ||  || align=right data-sort-value="0.67" | 670 m || 
|-id=927 bgcolor=#fefefe
| 524927 ||  || — || April 13, 2004 || Kitt Peak || Spacewatch ||  || align=right data-sort-value="0.60" | 600 m || 
|-id=928 bgcolor=#fefefe
| 524928 ||  || — || April 13, 2004 || Kitt Peak || Spacewatch ||  || align=right data-sort-value="0.67" | 670 m || 
|-id=929 bgcolor=#d6d6d6
| 524929 ||  || — || April 13, 2004 || Kitt Peak || Spacewatch ||  || align=right | 3.6 km || 
|-id=930 bgcolor=#d6d6d6
| 524930 ||  || — || April 13, 2004 || Kitt Peak || Spacewatch ||  || align=right | 2.9 km || 
|-id=931 bgcolor=#fefefe
| 524931 ||  || — || April 13, 2004 || Kitt Peak || Spacewatch ||  || align=right data-sort-value="0.55" | 550 m || 
|-id=932 bgcolor=#fefefe
| 524932 ||  || — || April 13, 2004 || Kitt Peak || Spacewatch ||  || align=right data-sort-value="0.71" | 710 m || 
|-id=933 bgcolor=#E9E9E9
| 524933 ||  || — || April 13, 2004 || Kitt Peak || Spacewatch ||  || align=right | 1.1 km || 
|-id=934 bgcolor=#d6d6d6
| 524934 ||  || — || April 13, 2004 || Kitt Peak || Spacewatch ||  || align=right | 2.3 km || 
|-id=935 bgcolor=#d6d6d6
| 524935 ||  || — || April 14, 2004 || Catalina || CSS ||  || align=right | 3.2 km || 
|-id=936 bgcolor=#fefefe
| 524936 ||  || — || April 12, 2004 || Kitt Peak || Spacewatch ||  || align=right data-sort-value="0.79" | 790 m || 
|-id=937 bgcolor=#E9E9E9
| 524937 ||  || — || April 16, 2004 || Socorro || LINEAR ||  || align=right | 1.7 km || 
|-id=938 bgcolor=#fefefe
| 524938 ||  || — || March 27, 2004 || Socorro || LINEAR ||  || align=right data-sort-value="0.91" | 910 m || 
|-id=939 bgcolor=#d6d6d6
| 524939 ||  || — || November 14, 2001 || Kitt Peak || Spacewatch ||  || align=right | 3.4 km || 
|-id=940 bgcolor=#fefefe
| 524940 ||  || — || April 16, 2004 || Kitt Peak || Spacewatch ||  || align=right data-sort-value="0.77" | 770 m || 
|-id=941 bgcolor=#d6d6d6
| 524941 ||  || — || April 16, 2004 || Kitt Peak || Spacewatch ||  || align=right | 2.9 km || 
|-id=942 bgcolor=#E9E9E9
| 524942 ||  || — || April 20, 2004 || Kitt Peak || Spacewatch ||  || align=right | 1.4 km || 
|-id=943 bgcolor=#FA8072
| 524943 ||  || — || April 20, 2004 || Socorro || LINEAR ||  || align=right data-sort-value="0.59" | 590 m || 
|-id=944 bgcolor=#fefefe
| 524944 ||  || — || October 20, 1995 || Kitt Peak || Spacewatch ||  || align=right data-sort-value="0.75" | 750 m || 
|-id=945 bgcolor=#E9E9E9
| 524945 ||  || — || April 19, 2004 || Kitt Peak || Spacewatch ||  || align=right | 2.0 km || 
|-id=946 bgcolor=#d6d6d6
| 524946 ||  || — || April 22, 2004 || Kitt Peak || Spacewatch ||  || align=right | 2.2 km || 
|-id=947 bgcolor=#d6d6d6
| 524947 ||  || — || April 22, 2004 || Kitt Peak || Spacewatch ||  || align=right | 4.2 km || 
|-id=948 bgcolor=#d6d6d6
| 524948 ||  || — || April 21, 2004 || Kitt Peak || Spacewatch ||  || align=right | 1.9 km || 
|-id=949 bgcolor=#E9E9E9
| 524949 ||  || — || May 10, 2000 || Prescott || P. G. Comba ||  || align=right | 1.4 km || 
|-id=950 bgcolor=#E9E9E9
| 524950 ||  || — || May 9, 2004 || Kitt Peak || Spacewatch ||  || align=right | 1.8 km || 
|-id=951 bgcolor=#fefefe
| 524951 ||  || — || May 15, 2004 || Socorro || LINEAR ||  || align=right data-sort-value="0.98" | 980 m || 
|-id=952 bgcolor=#E9E9E9
| 524952 ||  || — || May 15, 2004 || Campo Imperatore || CINEOS ||  || align=right | 1.4 km || 
|-id=953 bgcolor=#d6d6d6
| 524953 ||  || — || April 25, 2004 || Kitt Peak || Spacewatch ||  || align=right | 3.3 km || 
|-id=954 bgcolor=#d6d6d6
| 524954 ||  || — || May 14, 2004 || Kitt Peak || Spacewatch ||  || align=right | 3.2 km || 
|-id=955 bgcolor=#d6d6d6
| 524955 ||  || — || May 13, 2004 || Kitt Peak || Spacewatch ||  || align=right | 2.9 km || 
|-id=956 bgcolor=#fefefe
| 524956 ||  || — || May 9, 2004 || Kitt Peak || Spacewatch ||  || align=right data-sort-value="0.99" | 990 m || 
|-id=957 bgcolor=#fefefe
| 524957 ||  || — || January 12, 2011 || Mount Lemmon || Mount Lemmon Survey ||  || align=right data-sort-value="0.87" | 870 m || 
|-id=958 bgcolor=#fefefe
| 524958 ||  || — || May 19, 2004 || Kitt Peak || Spacewatch ||  || align=right data-sort-value="0.75" | 750 m || 
|-id=959 bgcolor=#E9E9E9
| 524959 ||  || — || May 9, 2004 || Kitt Peak || Spacewatch ||  || align=right | 1.8 km || 
|-id=960 bgcolor=#d6d6d6
| 524960 ||  || — || May 27, 2004 || Kitt Peak || Spacewatch ||  || align=right | 3.4 km || 
|-id=961 bgcolor=#fefefe
| 524961 ||  || — || June 12, 2004 || Siding Spring || SSS ||  || align=right data-sort-value="0.78" | 780 m || 
|-id=962 bgcolor=#E9E9E9
| 524962 ||  || — || June 11, 2004 || Kitt Peak || Spacewatch ||  || align=right | 2.4 km || 
|-id=963 bgcolor=#fefefe
| 524963 ||  || — || June 15, 2004 || Socorro || LINEAR || H || align=right data-sort-value="0.81" | 810 m || 
|-id=964 bgcolor=#E9E9E9
| 524964 ||  || — || June 15, 2004 || Socorro || LINEAR ||  || align=right | 1.8 km || 
|-id=965 bgcolor=#d6d6d6
| 524965 ||  || — || June 21, 2004 || Socorro || LINEAR ||  || align=right | 3.7 km || 
|-id=966 bgcolor=#E9E9E9
| 524966 ||  || — || July 11, 2004 || Socorro || LINEAR ||  || align=right | 1.1 km || 
|-id=967 bgcolor=#E9E9E9
| 524967 ||  || — || July 11, 2004 || Socorro || LINEAR ||  || align=right | 1.4 km || 
|-id=968 bgcolor=#FA8072
| 524968 ||  || — || July 14, 2004 || Socorro || LINEAR ||  || align=right data-sort-value="0.65" | 650 m || 
|-id=969 bgcolor=#E9E9E9
| 524969 ||  || — || July 14, 2004 || Socorro || LINEAR ||  || align=right | 2.2 km || 
|-id=970 bgcolor=#E9E9E9
| 524970 ||  || — || July 11, 2004 || Socorro || LINEAR ||  || align=right | 1.8 km || 
|-id=971 bgcolor=#E9E9E9
| 524971 ||  || — || July 15, 2004 || Siding Spring || SSS ||  || align=right | 1.3 km || 
|-id=972 bgcolor=#fefefe
| 524972 ||  || — || August 8, 2004 || Anderson Mesa || LONEOS || H || align=right data-sort-value="0.76" | 760 m || 
|-id=973 bgcolor=#E9E9E9
| 524973 ||  || — || August 8, 2004 || Socorro || LINEAR ||  || align=right | 1.5 km || 
|-id=974 bgcolor=#FFC2E0
| 524974 ||  || — || August 10, 2004 || Siding Spring || SSS || AMO || align=right data-sort-value="0.74" | 740 m || 
|-id=975 bgcolor=#fefefe
| 524975 ||  || — || August 8, 2004 || Socorro || LINEAR ||  || align=right data-sort-value="0.68" | 680 m || 
|-id=976 bgcolor=#E9E9E9
| 524976 ||  || — || August 9, 2004 || Siding Spring || SSS ||  || align=right | 2.2 km || 
|-id=977 bgcolor=#FA8072
| 524977 ||  || — || July 17, 2004 || Socorro || LINEAR || H || align=right data-sort-value="0.69" | 690 m || 
|-id=978 bgcolor=#E9E9E9
| 524978 ||  || — || August 9, 2004 || Socorro || LINEAR ||  || align=right | 2.5 km || 
|-id=979 bgcolor=#E9E9E9
| 524979 ||  || — || August 8, 2004 || Socorro || LINEAR ||  || align=right | 2.0 km || 
|-id=980 bgcolor=#E9E9E9
| 524980 ||  || — || August 8, 2004 || Anderson Mesa || LONEOS ||  || align=right | 1.5 km || 
|-id=981 bgcolor=#E9E9E9
| 524981 ||  || — || August 9, 2004 || Socorro || LINEAR ||  || align=right | 2.2 km || 
|-id=982 bgcolor=#d6d6d6
| 524982 ||  || — || August 10, 2004 || Socorro || LINEAR ||  || align=right | 2.6 km || 
|-id=983 bgcolor=#fefefe
| 524983 ||  || — || July 13, 2004 || Siding Spring || SSS ||  || align=right data-sort-value="0.99" | 990 m || 
|-id=984 bgcolor=#fefefe
| 524984 ||  || — || August 8, 2004 || Socorro || LINEAR ||  || align=right data-sort-value="0.91" | 910 m || 
|-id=985 bgcolor=#d6d6d6
| 524985 ||  || — || August 9, 2004 || Socorro || LINEAR ||  || align=right | 3.1 km || 
|-id=986 bgcolor=#E9E9E9
| 524986 ||  || — || August 9, 2004 || Socorro || LINEAR ||  || align=right | 2.8 km || 
|-id=987 bgcolor=#E9E9E9
| 524987 ||  || — || August 10, 2004 || Socorro || LINEAR ||  || align=right | 1.5 km || 
|-id=988 bgcolor=#E9E9E9
| 524988 ||  || — || August 12, 2004 || Socorro || LINEAR ||  || align=right | 2.6 km || 
|-id=989 bgcolor=#E9E9E9
| 524989 ||  || — || July 21, 2004 || Siding Spring || SSS ||  || align=right | 1.3 km || 
|-id=990 bgcolor=#FA8072
| 524990 ||  || — || August 11, 2004 || Socorro || LINEAR ||  || align=right data-sort-value="0.68" | 680 m || 
|-id=991 bgcolor=#d6d6d6
| 524991 ||  || — || August 8, 2004 || Socorro || LINEAR ||  || align=right | 3.9 km || 
|-id=992 bgcolor=#E9E9E9
| 524992 ||  || — || August 19, 2004 || Reedy Creek || J. Broughton ||  || align=right | 2.3 km || 
|-id=993 bgcolor=#fefefe
| 524993 ||  || — || August 20, 2004 || Kitt Peak || Spacewatch ||  || align=right data-sort-value="0.65" | 650 m || 
|-id=994 bgcolor=#E9E9E9
| 524994 ||  || — || August 21, 2004 || Siding Spring || SSS ||  || align=right | 1.8 km || 
|-id=995 bgcolor=#E9E9E9
| 524995 ||  || — || August 11, 2004 || Socorro || LINEAR ||  || align=right | 2.1 km || 
|-id=996 bgcolor=#fefefe
| 524996 ||  || — || September 7, 2004 || Kitt Peak || Spacewatch ||  || align=right data-sort-value="0.62" | 620 m || 
|-id=997 bgcolor=#E9E9E9
| 524997 ||  || — || September 7, 2004 || Kitt Peak || Spacewatch ||  || align=right | 1.2 km || 
|-id=998 bgcolor=#fefefe
| 524998 ||  || — || September 8, 2004 || Socorro || LINEAR || H || align=right data-sort-value="0.50" | 500 m || 
|-id=999 bgcolor=#E9E9E9
| 524999 ||  || — || September 8, 2004 || Socorro || LINEAR ||  || align=right | 2.1 km || 
|-id=000 bgcolor=#E9E9E9
| 525000 ||  || — || September 8, 2004 || Socorro || LINEAR ||  || align=right | 2.0 km || 
|}

References

External links 
 Discovery Circumstances: Numbered Minor Planets (520001)–(525000) (IAU Minor Planet Center)

0524